= New Jersey Inventors Hall of Fame =

American honorary association founded in 1987

Coordinates: 40.783295°N 74.430531°W

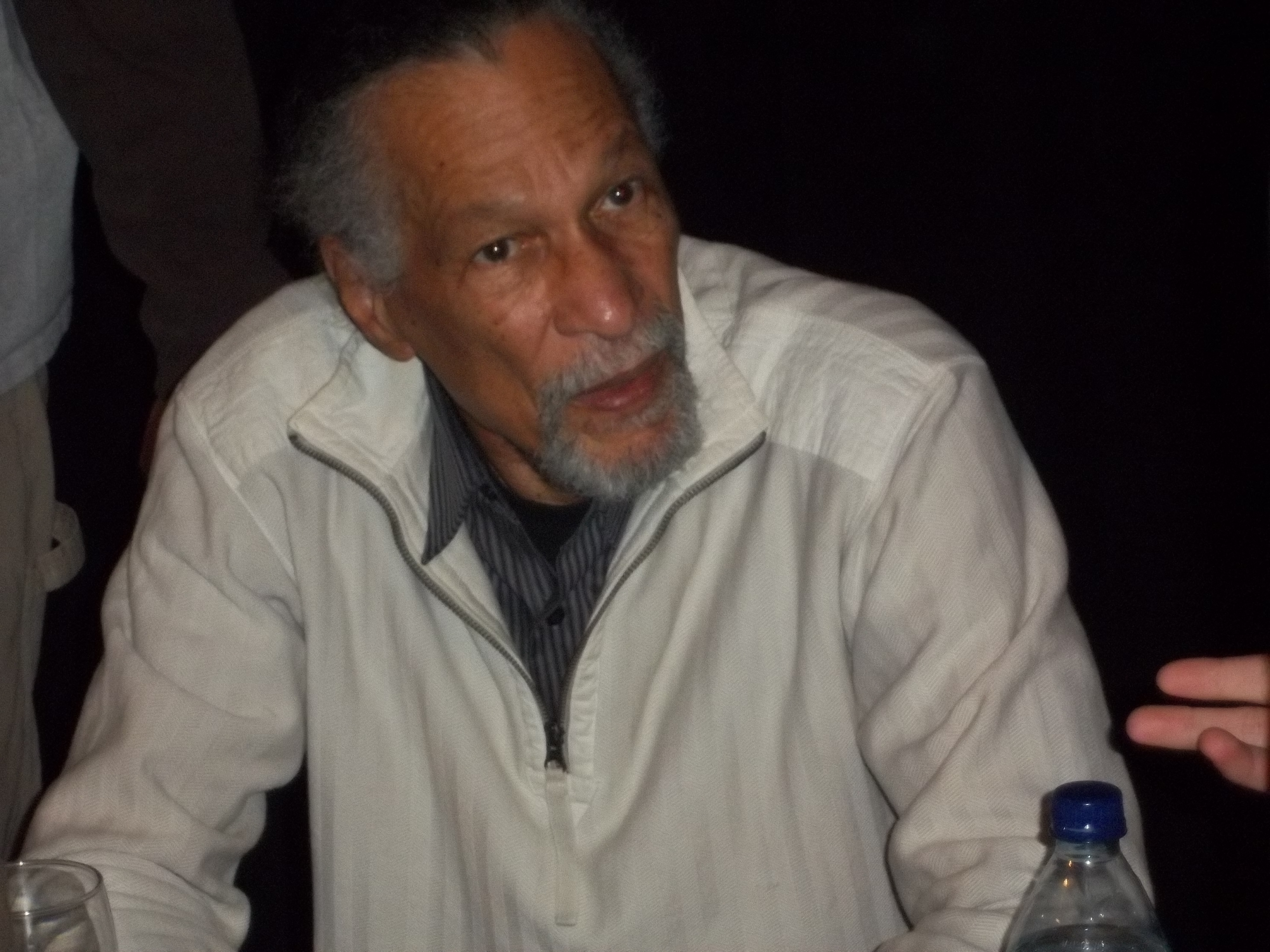
James West (born 1931)

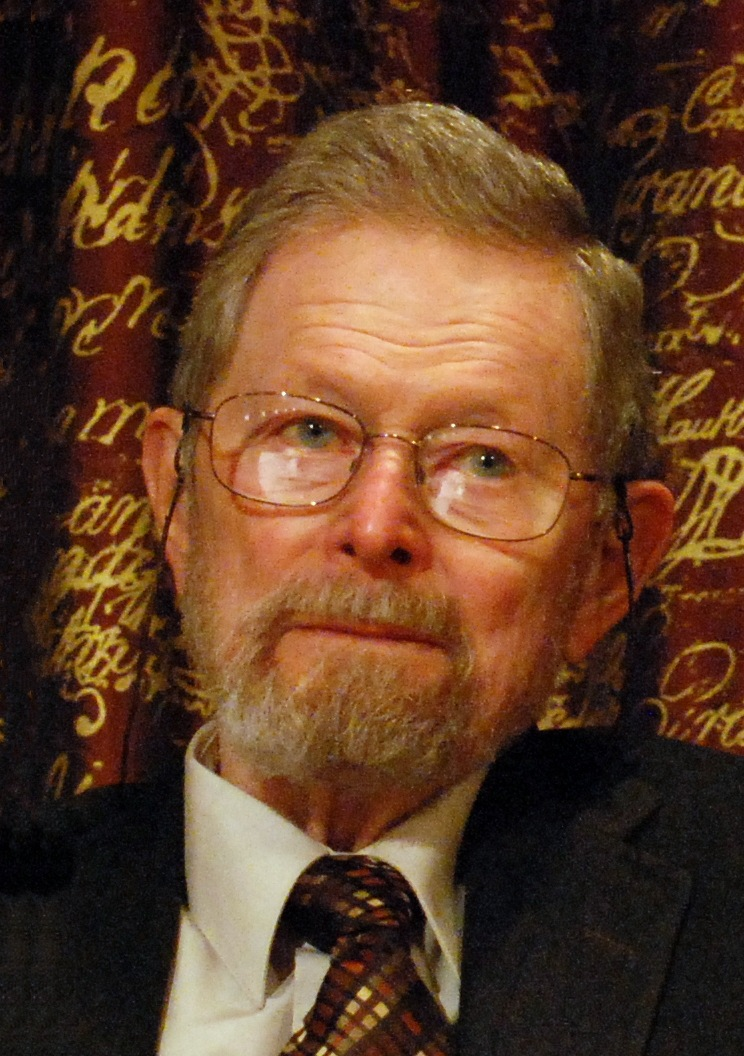
George Elwood Smith (born 1930)

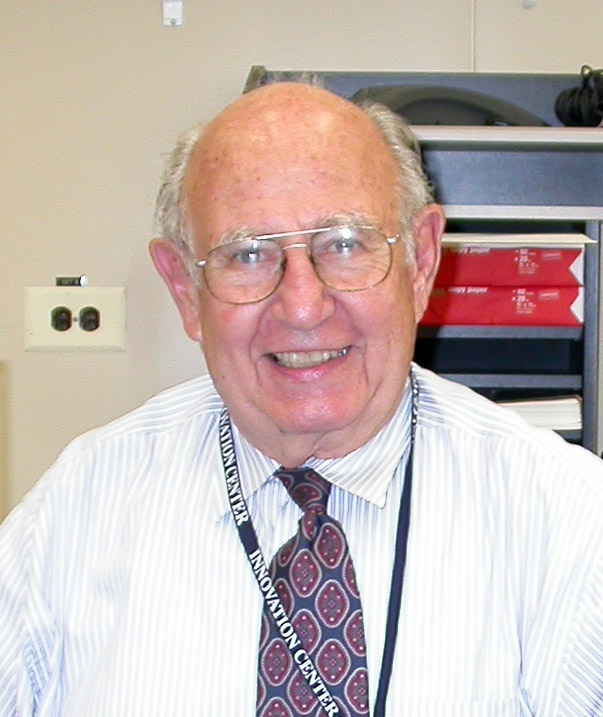
Eugene Irving Gordon (1930–2014)

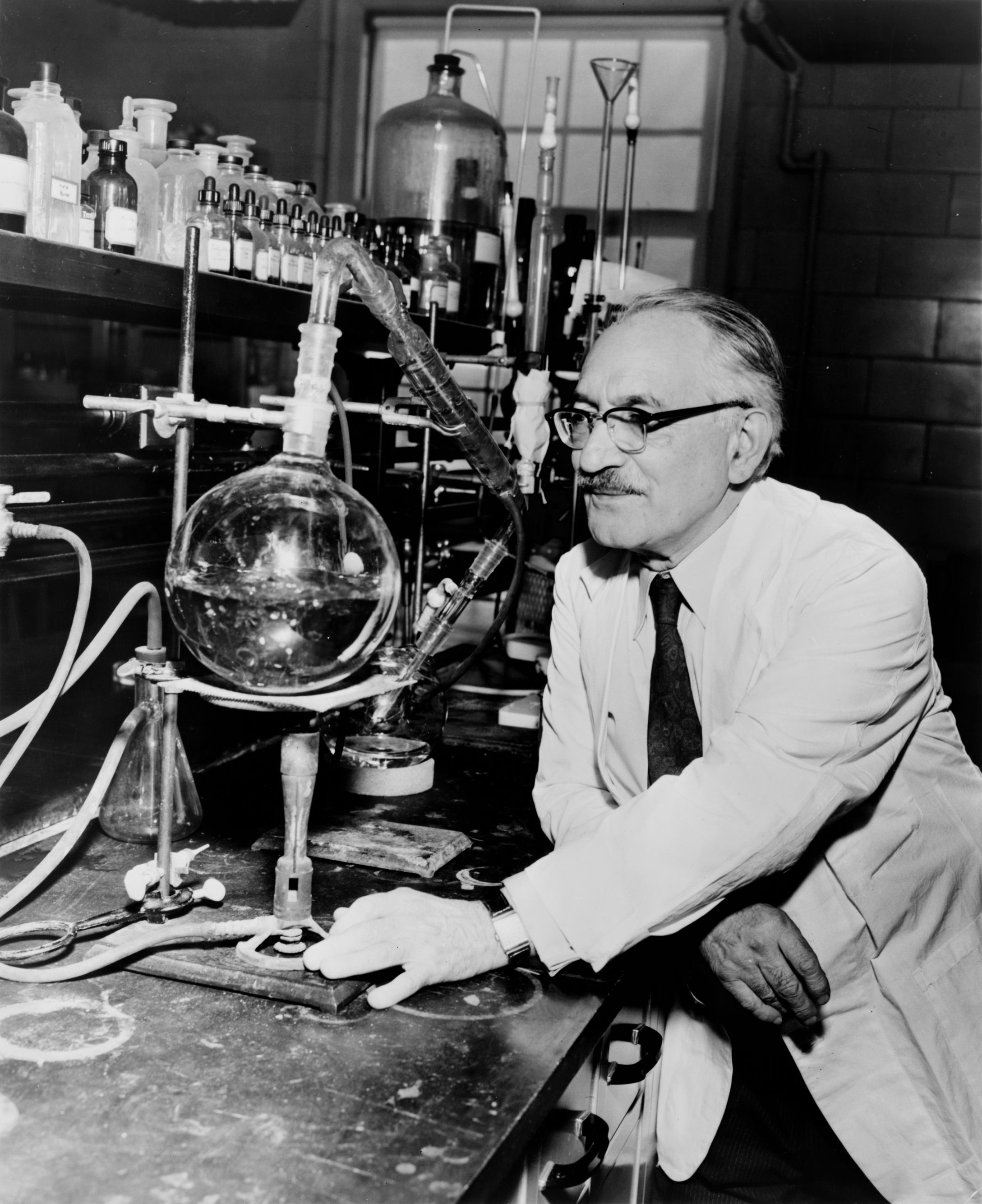
Selman Abraham Waksman (1888–1973)

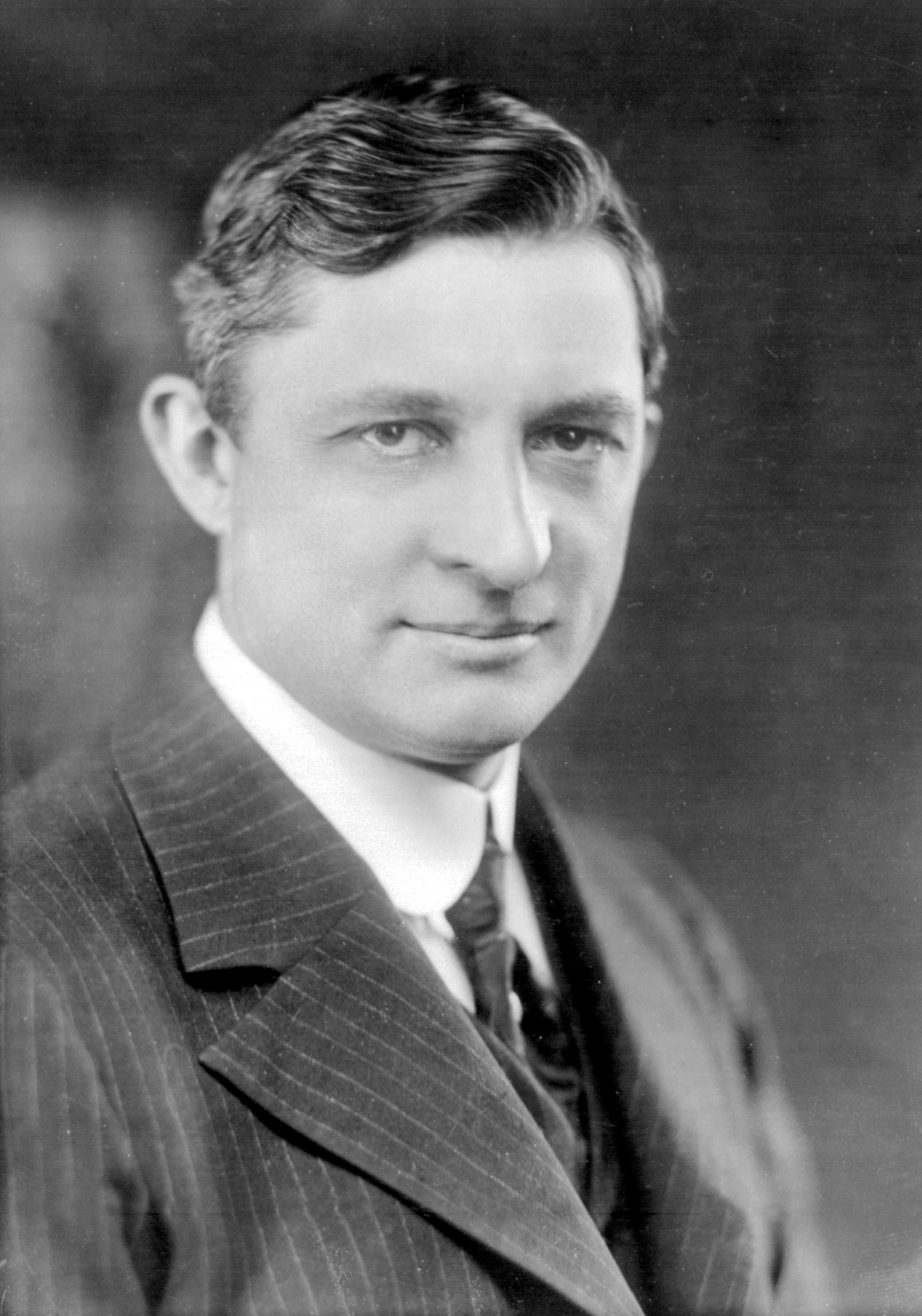
Willis Haviland Carrier (1876–1950)

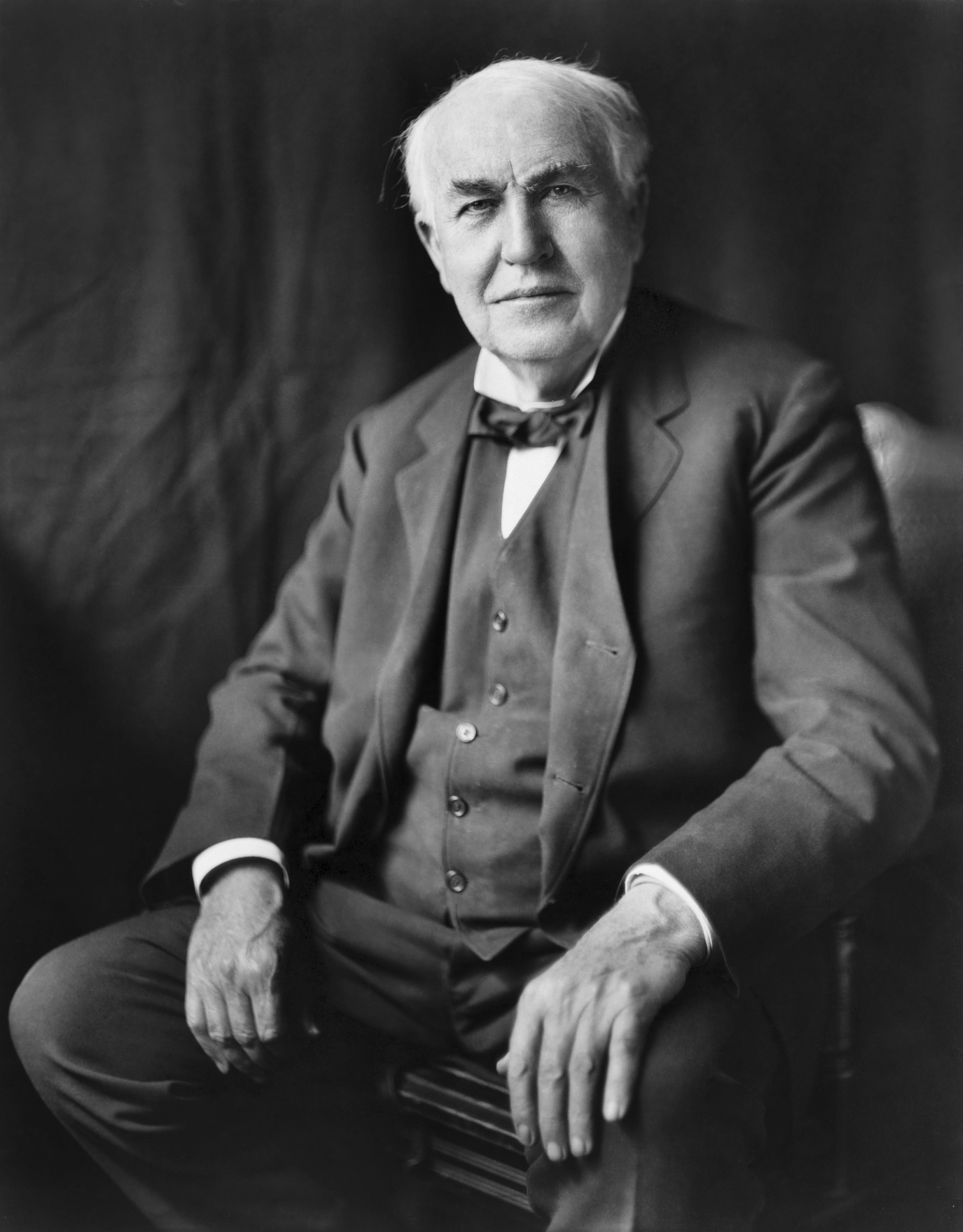
Thomas Alva Edison (1847-1931)

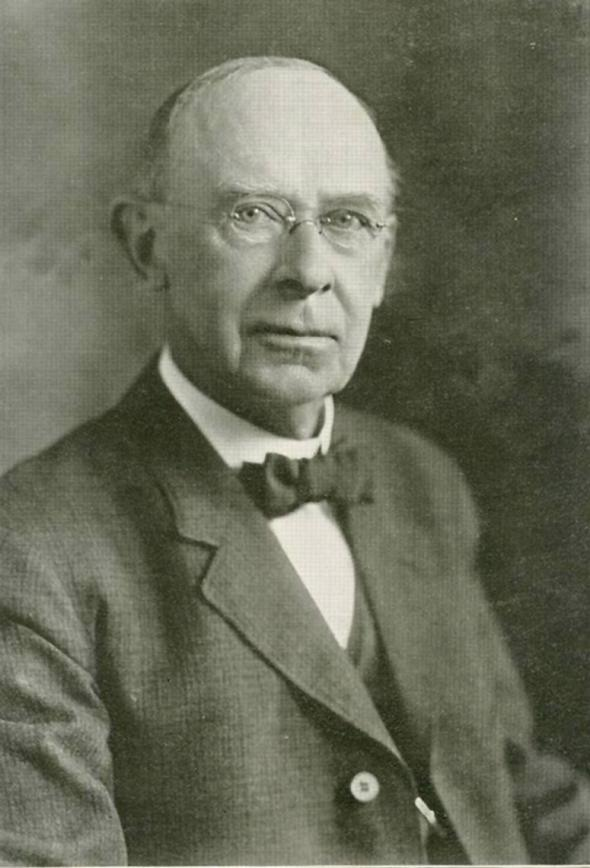
Samuel Leeds Allen (1841–1918)

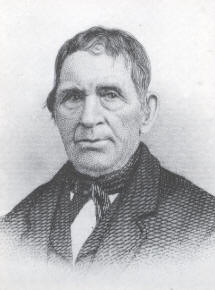
Seth Boyden (1788–1870)

The New Jersey Inventor's Hall of Fame was established in 1987 to honor individuals and corporations in New Jersey for their inventions. Award recipients are recognized at the annual Award Banquet Dinner. The New Jersey Inventors Hall of Fame operated from 1987 to 2002 at the New Jersey Institute of Technology, from 2003 to 2007 with support from the Research and Development Council of New Jersey. Starting in 2008 it was under the aegis of Stevens Institute of Technology Office of Academic Entrepreneurship. In 2010, Greenberg Traurig became a co-sponsor of the organization.

== Hall of Fame Inductees ==
Name	Year	Invention	NJ affiliation
Seth Boyden	1989	malleable iron	Newark, New Jersey worked
John Stevens (inventor)	1989	various innovations	Hoboken, New Jersey lived
Jan A. Rajchman	1989	read-only memory	Radio Corporation of America
Albert Einstein	1989	theoretical physics	Institute for Advanced Study
Alfred Vail	1989	telegraph	Speedwell Ironworks
Thomas A. Edison	1989	various innovations	Edison laboratory
Leo Sternbach	1989	benzodiazepines	Hoffman-La Roche
Selman Waksman	1989	streptomycin	Rutgers University
Roy Weber	1989	Intelligent Network Services - 800 Number	Bell Labs
Vladimir Zworykin	1989	television	Radio Corporation of America
Jerome H. Lemelson	1990		
Oberlin Smith	1990	magnetic recording	Bridgeton, New Jersey lived
Hannibal Goodwin	1990		Newark, New Jersey lived
Edward Weston (chemist)	1990		New Jersey Institute of Technology
Karl G. Jansky	1992	radio telescope	Bell Labs
Albert Rose (physicist)	1992	video camera tube	Radio Corporation of America
Paul K. Weimer	1992	thin-film transistor	Radio Corporation of America
John H. Sinfelt	1992	unleaded gasoline	ExxonMobil
James Hillier	1992	electron microscope	Radio Corporation of America
Solomon Andrews (inventor)	1992	dirigible	Perth Amboy, New Jersey lived
Walter Lincoln Hawkins	1992		Bell Labs
Charles Joseph Fletcher	1993	aerospace innovations	Franklin, New Jersey lived
Sidney Pestka	1993		Hoffmann-La Roche
Robert Wendell Lucky	1993		Bell Labs
Walter Brattain	1994	transistor	Bell Labs
William Shockley	1994	transistor	Bell Labs
John Bardeen	1994	transistor	Bell Labs
Glenn Dimmick	1995	Sound Motion Picture Recording	RCA
Les Paul	1996	guitar pickup	Mahwah, New Jersey lived
Harry F. Olson	1996		Radio Corporation of America
James L. Flanagan	1997		Rutgers University
Richard Howland Ranger	1997		Radio Corporation of America
Alfred Y. Cho	1997		Bell Labs
Allen Balcom DuMont	1998	television	DuMont Television Network
William O. Baker	1998	synthetic rubber	Bell Labs
Edwin Howard Armstrong	1998	FM radio, regenerative receiver, superheterodyne receiver	Alpine, New Jersey worked
Arthur Leonard Schawlow	1999		Bell Labs
Morton A. Kreitchman	1999	fluid control valves	Valcor Engineering Corporation
Willis Haviland Carrier	1999	air conditioning	Newark, New Jersey worked
Simon Lake	2000	submarine innovations	Pleasantville, New Jersey born
Arthur Nobile	2000	prednisone	Newark, New Jersey born
Martin Goetz	2000	software	Applied Data Research
Lee de Forest	2001	audion tube	
Eger V. Murphree	2001	fluid catalytic cracking	ExxonMobil
Donald L. Campbell	2001	fluid catalytic cracking	ExxonMobil
Arun Netravali	2001	HDTV	Bell Labs
Gerald Ash	2001	Dynamic Non-Hierarchical Routing	Bell Labs
Herwig Kogelnik	2002		Bell Labs
John Augustus Roebling	2002	suspension bridge innovations	Trenton, New Jersey worked
Samuel Leeds Allen	2004	Flexible Flyer	Moorestown Township, New Jersey
James M. Early	2004	Early effect	Bell Labs
Calvin Souther Fuller	2005	photovoltaics	Bell Labs
Gerard A. Alphonse	2005		IEEE
Dennis MacAlistair Ritchie	2006	programming languages	Bell Labs
Kenneth Lane Thompson	2006	programming languages	Bell Labs
Harold Stephen Black	2006	negative feedback amplifier	Bell Labs
Henry Orenstein	2006	various toys	Topper Toys
James West	2008	electret microphone	Bell Labs
Eugene I. Gordon	2008	fiber optics innovations	Bell Labs
George E. Smith	2008	charge-coupled device	Bell Labs
Willard Boyle	2008	charge-coupled device	Bell Labs
Gerhard M. Sessler	2008	electret microphone	Bell Labs
Edward C. Taylor	2008	tetracycline	Princeton University
Herman Sokol	2009	pemetrexed	Bristol-Myers Squibb
Michael Francis Tompsett	2010	First Thermal and Charge Coupled Imager Patents, CCD Cameras and MOS Video ADC	Bell Labs
Lynn Schneemeyer	2011	material science innovations	Rutgers University
Arthur A. Gertzman	2011	Synthetic Bone Graft Materials, Malleable Paste for Filling Bone Defects	Gertzman Enterprises
John Siekierka	2011	Research and Development for Anti-Inflammatory Drug and Delivery Device	Bell Labs
William K. Hagmann	2012	medicinal chemistry innovations	Merck & Co
Elwin Orton	2012	Breakthroughs and Saving the U.S. Dogwood Industry	Rutgers University
Shu- Tung Li	2012	Medical Implants for the Repair and Regeneration of Soft Tissue and Bones	Collagen Matrix, Inc.
Endre Alexander Balazs	2012	Orthopedic Research & Groundbreaking Discoveries in Utilizing Hyaluron for Therapeutic Purposes	Columbia University Medical Center; Biomatrix, Inc. (NJ Resident)
C. Frank Wheatley Jr.	2013	Power semiconductor devices and integrated circuits and most notably the Insulated-Gate Bipolar Transistor (IGBT)	RCA
Leo Schenker	2013	Patented inventions and discoveries related to touch tone dialing and its immense impact in the public switch telephone network (PSTN)	IEEE
Sander G. Mills	2013	Discoveries in cancer research and most notably the substance Aprepitant, which has had worldwide impact in patient compliance/tolerance for chemotherapy and other cancer treatments	Merck & Co.
Adel A. Ahmed	2013	Bipolar integrated circuit design and worldwide use of the Ground-Fault Circuit Interrupter (GFCI) integrated circuit	RCA
Philip Anderson	2013	Elucidating the electronic structure of magnetic and disordered systems, which allowed for the development of electronic switching and memory devices in computers	Bell Labs
Jack Craft	2014	TV and radio integrated circuit designs	RCA
Rajiv V. Joshi	2014	Development of integrated circuits (IC), memory and predictive analytics	Columbia University (NJ Resident)
John R. Pierce	2014	Information theory and global and satellite communications	Bell Labs
Vladimir S. Ban	2014	Semi-conductor and optical network technologies	RCA
Krishan K. Sabnani	2014	Global communication networks	Bell Labs
Nikola Tesla	2014	Patented inventions transforming electrical engineering principles including alternating current (AC) and the radio	Tesla Electric Light and Manufacturing
Edward Cecelski		VCR, metal disk player	RCA
Dennis D. Jamiolkowski	2015	Absorbable polymers and their applications in implantable medical and surgical devices	Ethicon Inc.
John Fenn	2015	Electrospray Mass Spectrometry (ESMS) technique used in biomedical research	Princeton University
Owen O'Connor	2015	Patented work on novel small molecules, including a pioneering drug portfolio for treatment of lymphoma	Columbia University (NJ Resident)
George Feldstein	2015	Audio, visual and automation technologies	Crestron Electronics
Salvatore Salamone	2016	Oncology research, Therapeutic Diagnostics, health care and medical device services	Rutgers University; Saladax Biomedical (NJ Resident)
Yann LeCun	2016	Image and speech recognition and advent of Convolution Neural Networks (CNNs)	Bell Labs
Donald Landry	2016	Cardiovascular Biology to cancer research	Columbia University (NJ Resident)
Howard Fidel	2016	Biomedical device patents and medical ultrasound	NJIT

Other Hall of Fame Inductees

- 1989
  - Calvin MacCracken
  - Roy Weber
- 1990
  - Hubert Lechevalier
  - Arthur Patchett
  - William Pfefferle
  - Harold Seidel
  - Marvin Weinstein
- 1991
  - Benjamin Abeles, George Cody
  - Carlyle Caldwell
  - Gordon W. Calundann
  - Andrew G. F. Dingwall
  - C. Reed Funk
  - Anthony D. Kurtz
  - Jerome Murray
- 1992
  - Melvin L. Druin
  - Frederick J. Karol
  - Harold Law
  - William L. Maxson
- 1993
  - Marc A. Chavannes, Alfred W. Fielding
  - Erwin Klingsberg
  - Keith D. Millis
- 1994
  - Jack Avins
  - William O. Geyer
  - George R. Hansen
  - Phillip H. Smith
  - Richard Williams (inventor)
- 1995
  - David Aronson (inventor)
  - Alvin M. Cohan
  - George deStevens
  - Joseph J. Mascuch
  - Glenn Leslie Dimmick
  - Kenneth S. Johnson
- 1996
  - Richard Dehmel (inventor)
  - Arnold J. Morway
  - Charles Frederick Wallace
  - N. Joseph Woodland
- 1997
  - Ezra Gould
  - Milton Morse
  - Harry L. Yale
- 1998
  - Joseph Abys
  - Nikil S. Jayant
  - Henry M. Rowan
- 1999
  - Cyrus W. Bemmels
  - Haig Kafafian
  - Morton A. Kreitchman
- 2000
  - Albert Ballman, Robert Laudise, Bell Laboratories/Lucent Technologies of Murray Hill, NJ
  - Alan White (inventor)
- 2001
  - Homer Z. Martin
  - Charles W. Tyson
  - Abdul Gaffar
  - Glen A. Reitmeier
- 2002
  - Isaac S. Blonder
  - Ben H. Tongue
  - Anthony E. Winston
- 2004
  - Dr. Corrado Dragone
  - Mr. Walter J. Krupick
  - Colonel Willian Blair
  - Dr. Meredith C. Gourdine
- 2005
  - William Trager
  - Howard J. Ellison
  - Clarence D. Chang, Anthony J. Silvestri, William H. Lang
- 2006
  - Daryl M. Chapin, Gerald L. Pearson
- 2009
  - Yvonne Claeys Brill
- 2010
  - Dr. Michael Tompsett
  - Dr. Andrew Chraplyvy
  - Dr. Robert Tkach
  - Dr. Kenneth Walker (inventor)

== Inventors of the Year ==
Name	Year	Invention	NJ affiliation
David Cushman	1989	captopril	Bristol-Myers Squibb
Miguel Ondetti	1989	captopril	Bristol-Myers Squibb
Dave Narasimhan	1989		AlliedSignal
Raymond W. Ketchledge	1989		Bell Labs
Donald L. Klein	1994	Transistor	Bell Labs
Liang Tai Wu	1995	Asynchronous Transfer Mode	Bell Communications Research
John B. MacChesney	1995	optical communications	Bell Labs
James West	1995	electret microphone	Bell Labs
Tsong-Ho Wu & Richard Lau	1997	Self-Healing Ring Networks	Bell Communications Research
Bishnu Atal	2000	linear predictive coding	Bell Labs
Philip Warren Anderson	2001		Bell Labs
Irwin Gerszberg	2002	Innovations in DSL and Telco Plant	AT&T Labs
Hossein Eslambolchi	2002		Bell Labs
Robert Morris (cryptographer)	2004	cryptography	Bell Labs
Yeheskel Bar-Ness	2006		New Jersey Institute of Technology
Sidney Pestka	2008	interferon	Hoffman-La Roche
Gianluca Paladini	2011	volume visualization	Siemens
Comaniciu	2011	robust object tracking	Siemens
Pal Maliga	2011	chloroplast transformation, plastid transformation	Rutgers University
Paula Tallal	2012	educational software innovations	Rutgers University
Bruce McNair	2012		
Sergei Kotenko	2012		
Nirwan Ansari	2012		
Nicholi Vorsa	2013		
Richard Mammone.	2013		
Ximing Guo and Standish, K. Allen Jr.	2013		
Joseph Giovannoli	2013		
Moon Hae Sunwoo.	2014		
Richard E Riman.	2014		
Athula B. Attygalle	2014		
Raziq Yaqub.	2014		
William T. Murphy	2014		

Other Inventors of the Year

- 1989
  - Frank Gutleber
  - Sheldon Karesh, Dusan Prevorsek
  - Leo Harwood
  - Amos Joel, Jr.
  - Glenn Johnson, Jr.
  - Walter Kosonocky
  - Mandayam Narasimhan
  - Deger Tunc
- 1990
  - Michael Catapano, Renato Noe
  - Daniel Kramer (inventor)
  - Juris Mednis
  - Franklin Reick
  - Bart Zoltan
- 1991
  - William Charney
  - Charles Covino
  - Jack R. Hartford
  - Frederick M. Kahan
  - Gregory H. Olsten
  - Joseph F. Rizzo
  - David Savage, Guido Sartori & Winston S. Ho
  - Stanley S. Schodowski
  - Joseph V. Milo
- 1992
  - Murrae Bowden, Larry F. Thompson
  - John D. Geberth, Jr.
  - Gideon Goldstein
  - August F. Manz
  - Victor Palinczar
  - Ross C. Terrell
- 1993
  - Michael J. Flowers
  - Louis L. Grube
  - Sue Wilson
- 1994
  - Eric J. Addeo
  - Robert E. Kerwin, Donald L. Klein, John C. Sarace
  - Kuo-Yann Lai
  - June D. Passaretti
  - Milan R. Uskokovic
  - Gilbert Zweig
- 1995
  - Richard Frenkiel
  - Robert D. Howson
  - Carl H. X
  - Liang Tai Wu
- 1996
  - Leslie R. Avery
  - Gilbert Buchalter
  - Lanny S. Smoot
  - Dominik M. Wiktor
- 1997
  - Arthur L. Babson
  - Walter Jinotti
  - Steven M. Kuznicki
  - Lee-Fang Wei
  - Tsong-Ho Wu, Richard C.L. Lau
- 1998
  - Gary Ver Strate Mark J. Struglinski of Exxon Chemical Company in Linden, John E. Johnston of Warren Exxon Research and Engineering Co. in Annandale, Roger K. West
  - Joseph Dettling of Howell - Zhicheng Hu, Y.K. Lui, C.Z. Wan, Engelhard Industries
  - Michael Pappas (inventor)
  - Melvin E. Kamen
  - John Mickowski of Tymac Controls Corp. in Franklin
- 1999
  - Andrew Chraplyvy, Matawan Robert Tkach, Kenneth Walker (inventor)
  - William Hickerson
- 2000
  - Gerard P. Canevari, Robert J. Fiocco, Richard R. Lessard
  - Alfonso DiMino
  - Barin Haskell
- 2001
  - J. Thomas Jennings
  - James D. Johnston (inventor)
  - Jack H. Winters
- 2002
  - Valerie A. Bell
  - Irwin Gerszberg
  - Antoni S. Gozdz, Jean-Marie Tarascon, Paul C. Warren
- 2004
  - Dr. Igor Palley
- 2005
  - David M. Goldenberg
  - Jack R. Harford
  - Harry T. Roman
- 2006
  - Claude E. Gagna
- 2008
  - Amit Limaye
- 2009
  - Michael Seul
  - Christos Christodoulatos, George P. Korfiatis, Xiaoguang Meng, Mazakhir Dadachov
- 2010
  - Dr. Nicolas Girard (inventor)
  - Dr. Bijan Harichian
  - Richard Caizza

== Innovator Award ==
Name	Year	Field	NJ affiliation
Michael L. Recce	2005		
Lillian M. Gilbreth	2005	scientific management	Montclair, New Jersey
Albert Schatz	2005	streptomycin	Rutgers University
John von Neumann	2006	computer science	Institute for Advanced Study
Frank Bunker Gilbreth, Sr.	2006	scientific management	Montclair, New Jersey
Lyman Spitzer, Jr.	2006	theoretical physics	Princeton University
Michael Wong	2008		
Ali Abdi	2008		
Mohammed Ettouney	2008		
Kamalesh Sirkar	2009		New Jersey Institute of Technology
Effat S. Emamian	2009		
Raziq Yaqub	2009		
Leonard Cimini	2010		
Yun-Qing Shi	2010		
Linda Brzustowicz	2010		Rutgers University
Yun-Qing Shi	2010		
Gordon Thomas	2011		
Thomas Nosker	2011		
Louis J. Lanzerotti	2012		
Ricky John	2012		
Yingying Chen & Marco Gruteser & Richard P. Martin	2012		
Rajarathnam Chandramouli & K.P. Subbalakshmi	2012		
Jenny Zilberberg, Ph.D.	2013		
Antonio Valdevit, Ph.D.	2013		
Roberto Rojas-Cessa, Ph.D.	2013		
Scott C. Kachlany, Ph.D.	2013		
Treena L. Arinzeh, Ph.D.	2013		
David M. Tschaen, Ph.D.	2014		
Andrew W. Stamford, Ph.D.	2014		
Somenath Mitra, Ph.D.	2014		
T.V. Lakshman, Ph.D.	2014		
Jeffrey S. Abrams, M.D.	2014		

== Corporate Award ==
Company	Research area	Location	Year
AT&T Bell Laboratories	telecommunications	Berkeley Heights, New Jersey	1989
Merck and Company	pharmaceutical	Rahway, New Jersey	1990
David Sarnoff Research Center	television	Princeton, New Jersey	1991
Bell Communications Research	telecommunications	Livingston, New Jersey	1992
Bristol-Myers Squibb	pharmaceutical	Princeton, New Jersey	1993
Mobil Research and Development Corporation	petrochemical	Princeton, New Jersey	1993
Exxon Research and Engineering	petrochemical	Florham Park, New Jersey	1995
National Starch and Chemical Company	food science	Bridgewater, New Jersey	1996
Johnson & Johnson	health care	New Brunswick, New Jersey	1997
Howmedica	health care	Rutherford, New Jersey	1998
General Magnaplate Corporation	metallurgy	Linden, New Jersey	2009
Hoffman La Roche	pharmaceutical	Nutley, New Jersey	2009
Immunomedics	biotechnology	Morris Plains, New Jersey	2009
Becton Dickinson	health care	Franklin Lakes, New Jersey	2012
Celgene Corporation			2013
Honeywell International Inc.			2014

== Trustees Award ==
- Representative Rush Holt (2009)
- Dr. Ralph Izzo (2010)
- Dr. Jeong Kim (2011)
- Dr. Stephen Chu (2012)
- Shirley Ann Jackson, Ph.D. (2013)
- Greg Olsen, Ph.D. (2014)

== Outstanding Contributions Award ==
- Dr. Gertrude M. Clarke (2011)
- Inventor Harry Roman (2012)
- (2013)
- (2014)

== Graduate Student Award ==
- 2005
  - Yuanqiu Luo
  - Shuangquan Wang
- 2006
  - Sudhakar Shet
  - Dimitrios Zarkadas
- 2008
  - Zhiqiang Gao
  - Amey Shevtekar
  - Hong Zhang
- 2009
  - Chuan-Bi Lin
  - Ziqian Cecilia Dong
  - Dipshikha Biswas
- 2010
  - Ms. Jingjing Zhang
  - Dr. Xiaoling Chen
  - Dr. Asli Ergun
- 2011
  - Milan Begliarbekov
  - Komlan Egoh
  - Andrew Ihnen
  - Eric Stroud
- 2012
  - Xiaoling Fu
  - Linh Le
  - Seyed Babak Mahjour
  - Ishan Wathuthanthri
  - Jie Yang
  - Yan Zhang
- 2013
  - Xuening Chen, Ph.D.
  - Chun-Hao Lo, Ph.D.
  - Khondaker Salehin, Ph.D.
  - Wenting Zhang
- 2014
  - Hui Chen
  - Yexin Gu
  - Tao Han

== Special Award ==
- 1993
  - Bonnie L. James, Cherica Inc., Tuckerton
  - Italo Marchiony (1868-1954), Hoboken
- 1994
  - Donald J. Sauer
  - James T. Reynolds
  - John J. Frins
  - James Edward Johnstone
- 1995
  - Allan H. Willinger
  - Michael D. Mintz
  - William J. von Liebig
- 1996
  - Barbara Derkoski
  - Otto Niederer
- 1997
  - Martin C. Pettesch
- 1998
  - William Lowell of Maplewood, New Jersey for the golf tee
  - Quentin T. Kelly, Pennington and WorldWater Corp., Pennington
  - Melvin Levinson
- 1999
  - William Greeley
- 2000
  - Stephan Schaffan, Jr.
- 2001
  - David Brown (inventor)
  - Wellington Titus
  - Fred Topinka
- 2002
  - Dave Hammond
- 2004
  - Dr. Phillip J. Petillo
  - Dr. Majid Abou-Gharbia
- 2009
  - Michael J. Flowers
- 2010
  - Dr. Timothy Chang (inventor)
- 2012
  - Ken Zorovich & Yos Kumthampinij & John C. Earle
- 2013
  - Barry H. Katz, M.D.
- 2014
  - Ronnie Z. Bochner, M.D.

== Advancement of Invention Award ==
- New Jersey Institute of Technology in Newark, New Jersey (1997)
- New Jersey Commission on Science and Technology (1999)
- Gil Zweig (2009)
- Dr. Dr. Rainer Martini (2011)
- Dr. Dr. Hsuan Lillian Labowsky (2012)
- Dr. Yu-Dong Yao, Ph.D. (2013)
- Dr. Beatrice Hicks, D.Sc. (Hon) (2013)
- Dr. Leslie Brunell, P.E., Ph.D (2014)
- Dr. Beth McGrath, Mercedes McKay & Jason Sayres (2014)
- Dr. Joshua Weston (2014)

== See also ==
- National Inventors Hall of Fame
- Aviation Hall of Fame and Museum of New Jersey
- Edison Patent Award
