= Dimick =

Dimick may refer to:

- Horace Dimick, gunmaker and firearms dealer active in St. Louis, Missouri from 1849 through the early 1870s
- Mary Lord Dimick (1858–1948), the second wife of the 23rd United States president Benjamin Harrison
- Cecil I. and Mildred H. Dimick House at 575 West 800 North in Orem, Utah, United States, built in 1946
- Dimick B. Huntington (1808–1879), leading Indian interpreter in early Utah Territory
- Dimick Peaks, two peaks at the south side of the mouth of Dale Glacier in Victoria Land, Antarctica
- Alice M. Dimick (1878–1956), American mathematician with PhD from University of Pennsylvania.

== See also ==
- Dimmick
