= Cioabă =

Cioabă is a Romanian surname. Notable people with the surname include:

- Aristică Cioabă (born 1971), Romanian footballer and manager
- Florin Cioabă (1954–2013), Romanian Romani Pentecostal minister
- Dorin Cioabă (born 1969), Romanian Romani Pentecostal minister and son of Florin Cioabă
