= Fadia Nasser-Abu Alhija =

Israeli professor of education

- فادية ناصر
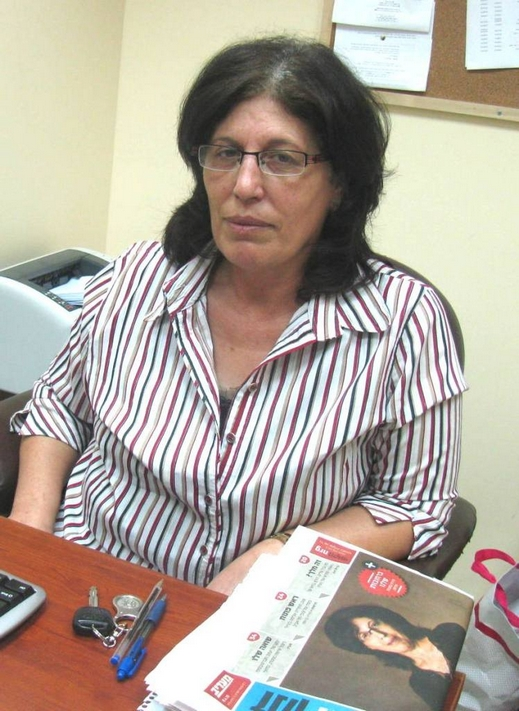
- Nasser-Abu Alhija in 2017
- Born: 1955 (age 70–71); Tira, Israel
- Education: Tel Aviv University (BA, MA), University of Georgia (PhD)
- Website: https://education.tau.ac.il/profile/fadia

Nadia Nasser-Abu Alhija (Arabic: فادية ناصر, Hebrew: פאדיה נאסר אבו אלהיג'א) is an Israeli Arab scholar who investigates research, measurement and evaluation methods in education. She is emeritus professor at the School of Education of Tel Aviv University and dean of Sakhnin College.

She is the first Arab woman to receive the title of Professor at an Israeli university, and the first to be nominated for membership on the Council for Higher Education in Israel.

== Biography ==
Nasser-Abu Alhija was born and grew up in Tira, Israel, as the fifth of ten children. In 1977, she completed a BA in sciences (mathematics, biology and chemistry) from Tel Aviv University, where she also received a teaching certificate in mathematics in 1980. After receiving her bachelor's, spent several years working as a high school teacher in Tira.

In 1989 she completed her MA in research methods in education from Tel Aviv University. In 1993 she started her doctorate in research methods, measurement and evaluation in education at the University of Georgia after receiving a grant from the United States embassy in Tel Aviv for Israeli Arab students; she received her degree in 1997. During her PhD, she worked as a research coordinator for GRE testing at the Educational Testing Service in Princeton.

== Academic career ==
Nasser-Abu Alhija's first academic position was at Beit Berl College in 1997. She began working as a lecturer at Tel Aviv University in 2000, becoming an associate professor and receiving a full professorship in April 2010, making her the first female Arab professor at an Israeli university. She was later named dean of the university's School of Education.

In 2012, she was nominated as a member of the Council of Higher Education in Israel, becoming the first Arab woman on the council. She resigned in 2016 in protest of the dismissal of the council's vice president, Hagit Messer Yaro, by Naftali Bennett, the Minister of Education.

In 2023, Nasser-Abu Alhija was appointed dean of the Sakhnin College for Teacher Education.
