= Dimmick =

Dimmick is a surname. Notable people with the surname include:

- Alan Dimmick (born 1961), Scottish photographer
- Carolyn R. Dimmick (1929–2025), United States federal judge
- Glenn Dimmick (1905–1999), American electrical engineer
- Mary Dimmick Harrison (1858–1948), second wife of the 23rd U.S. president Benjamin Harrison
- Milo Melankthon Dimmick (1811–1872), Democratic member of the U.S. House of Representatives from Pennsylvania
- William Harrison Dimmick (1815–1861), Democratic member of the U.S. House of Representatives from Pennsylvania

== See also ==
- Dimmick Township, LaSalle County, Illinois
