= Pal Maliga =

Plant molecular biologist

- Pal Maliga, Piscataway, NJ, in 2020
- Born: 23 February 1946; Budapest, Hungary
- Scientific career
- Fields: Agrobacterium engineering, Expression of recombinant proteins in Chloroplast, CRISPR/Cas for organellar genome engineering
- Institutions: Biological Research Centre (Hungarian Academy of Sciences), Szeged, Hungary; Advanced Genetic Sciences, Oakland CA; Department of Plant Biology, Rutgers University, New Brunswick, NJ; Waksman Institute of Microbiology, Rutgers University, Piscataway, NJ

Pal Maliga is a plant molecular biologist. He is Distinguished Professor of Plant Biology and Laboratory Director at the Waksman Institute of Microbiology, Rutgers University. He is known for developing the technology of chloroplast genome engineering in land plants and its applications in basic science and biotechnology.

== Research ==
=== Chloroplast genome engineering ===
The Maliga group in Szeged isolated chloroplast-encoded antibiotic-resistance and herbicide-resistant mutants in cultured tobacco cells and have shown that chloroplast-encoded antibiotic-resistance gives a selective advantage to chloroplasts in cultured cells. The ability to selectively enrich resistant chloroplasts was the foundation for obtaining chloroplast genome-engineered (transplastomic) tobacco plants. Extensive recombination of chloroplast genomes after chloroplast fusion confirmed homologous recombination in chloroplasts, providing a template for the design of chloroplast transformation vectors. The Maliga laboratory achieved tobacco (Nicotiana tabacum) chloroplast genome transformation in 1990 by selection for spectinomycin resistance encoded in the 16S rRNA, a process that was made efficient by selection for chimeric antibiotic resistance genes. The significance of chloroplast genome engineering as a tool to improve photosynthetic efficiency was recognized early on. In arabidopsis (Arabidopsis thaliana) efficient chloroplast transformation required knocking out a nuclear gene. The toolkit for chloroplast genome engineering was completed by post-transformation excision of marker genes using phage site-specific recombinases.

=== Agrobacterium transformation ===
The Maliga team constructed the pPZP Agrobacterium binary vector family, that served as the backbone for the CAMBIA and GATEWAY Agrobacterium vectors. Currently they are engaged in reengineering Agrobacterium for DNA delivery to chloroplasts, so that chloroplast transformation can be achieved by the floral dip protocol.

=== Chloroplast transcription ===
Chloroplast reverse genetics revealed the distinct role of two plastid RNA polymerases. The Maliga lab characterised plastid promoters in vivo and in vitro, and identified proteins that are parts of the plastid PEP transcription complex.

=== Expression of recombinant proteins in chloroplasts ===
One of the first biotechnological applications of chloroplast engineering was expression of Bacillus thuringiensis (Bt) crystal toxins genes, yielding 3-5% of the total leaf protein. Importantly, the insecticidal protein could be translated from the bacterial AU-rich mRNA, while for nuclear expression only synthetic GC-rich mRNAs could be used. Since then, the Maliga laboratory developed chloroplast expression tools that yield 25% tetanus subunit vaccine and >45% GFP in tobacco leaves. Their current goal is expression of orally bioavailable recombinant proteins in tobacco and lettuce chloroplasts.

== Awards and honors ==
- Thomas Alva Edison Patent Award, The Research and Development Council of New Jersey (1999)
- Hungarian Academy of Sciences, External member in the Section of Agricultural Sciences. (2001)
- Inventor of the Year, The New Jersey Inventors Hall of Fame (2011).
- Lawrence Bogorad Award for Excellence in Plant Biology, American Society of Plant Biologists (2016)
- Fellow of The American Association for the Advancement of Science (AAAS) (2016)
