= Kamleshwar =

Kamleshwar may refer to:

- Kamleshwar (writer), Indian writer and screenwriter
- Kamleshwar Patel (born 1974), Indian politician
- Kamaleshwar Mukherjee, Indian film actor and director
- Kamleshwar Dam, Visavadar, Gujarat, India

== See also ==
- Kamlesh, an Indian male given name
