= Salamone =

Salamone is a surname. Notable people with the surname include:

- Alexi Salamone (born 1987), ice sledge hockey player
- Antonio Salamone (1918–1998), member of the Sicilian Mafia
- Francisco Salamone (1897–1959), Argentine architect
- Salamone Rossi (ca. 1570–1630), Italian Jewish violinist
- Salvatore Salamone, scientist and researcher
- Thomas C. Salamone (1927–2014), American politician

== See also ==
- Salamon, surname
