= Hagit Messer Yaron =

- חגית מסר-ירון
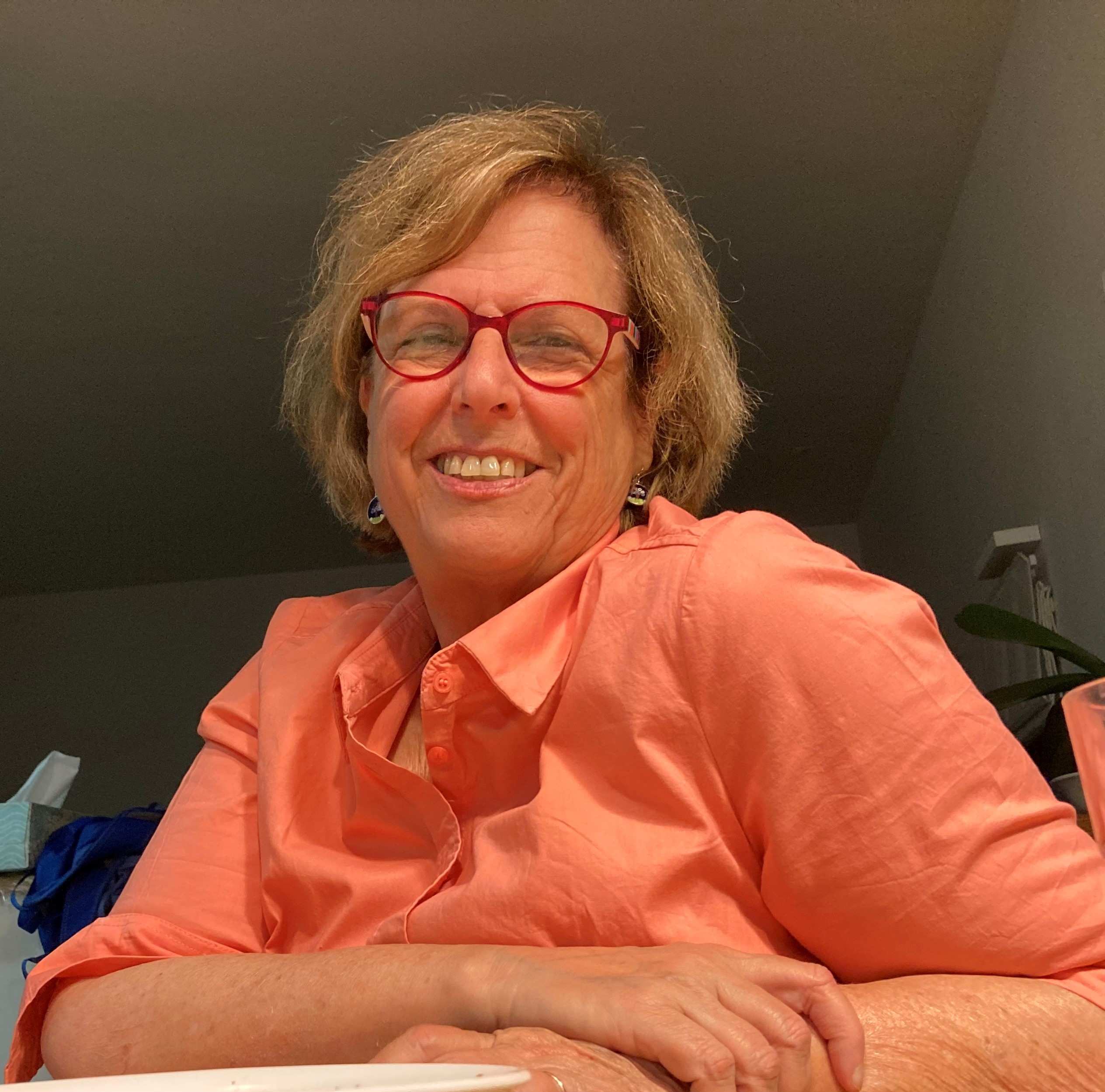
- Hagit Messer Yaron (2022)
- Born: May 13, 1953 (age 73)
- Education: Tel Aviv University; Yale University
- Occupations: electrical engineer, professor of electrical engineering, and businesswoman
- Known for: Kranzberg Chair Professor in Signal Processing at Tel Aviv University; President of Open University of Israel; Co-founder of ClimaCell

Hagit Messer Yaron (Hebrew: חגית מסר-ירון; born May 13, 1953) is an Israeli electrical engineer and businesswoman. She is a professor of electrical engineering. She is the Kranzberg Chair Professor in Signal Processing at Tel Aviv University. She was the President of Open University of Israel from 2008 to 2013. Messer Yaron is the first woman in Israel to be appointed as a full professor of electrical engineering.

== Biography ==
Messer Yaron was born and raised in Ramat HaSharon. Her mother Tova was a biology teacher and her father Oded served as a director general at the Ministry of Labor and as the Supervisor of Banks in Bank of Israel. Messer Yaron graduated from Tel Aviv University in 1977, and completed her Ph.D. in Electrical Engineering there in 1984, under the supervision of Yeheskel Bar-Ness. After Post-Doc at Yale University with Peter M. Schultheiss she joined the Faculty of Engineering at Tel Aviv University in 1986. Messer Yaron is married and mother of three.

== Contributions ==
Messer Yaron focuses on statistical signal processing with applications to source localization, communication and environmental monitoring. She has published numerous journal and conference papers, and several patents, and has supervised more than 100 graduate students. In 2006, Messer Yaron was the first to suggest using commercial microwave links for rainfall monitoring, and become the world pioneer in opportunistic sensing of the environment.

She is also interested in various aspects of higher-education and science policy, including:

- Ethics in Science and Technology. Messer Yaron is a member of COMEST and of the Executive Board of the IEEE global initiative on ethics of autonomous and intelligent systems
- Commercialization of academic research and Technology Transfer. She has several publications on the topic and she serves as a consultant to WIPO on IP policy for universities
- Messer Yaron is committed to the advancement of women in science and technology. She has founded the national council for the advancement of women in science in Israel and served as its 1st chair (2000-2004) and has been on the founding board of the European platform of women scientists.

Her doctoral students include Joseph Tabrikian.

== Public Service ==
Over the years she has held numerous administrative positions, including:

- The Chief Scientist at the Israeli Ministry of Science, Culture and Sport (2000-2003);
- The head of the Porter School of Environmental Studies (2004-2006);
- The Vice President for Research and Development at Tel Aviv University (2006-2008);
- The President of the Open University of Israel (2008-2013);
- The Vice Chair of the Council for Higher Education in Israel (2013-2016).
- Member, IEEE Global Public Policy Committee (GPPC) (2023–present).
- Member, IEEE Conduct Review Committee (CRC) (2023–present).
- Member, Board of Directors, Israel Oceanographic and Limnological Research (IOLR) (2022–present).
- Member, Board of Directors, RAMOT and TAU Ventures (2020–present).
- Chair, BASHAAR - Academic Community for Israeli Society (2017–present).
- Member, Board of Governors, the Center for Educational Technology (CET), Israel (2007–present).

In 2016 she also became a co-founder of ClimaCell.

== Recognition ==
- The IEEE Medal, 2024
- The IEEE Clementina Saduwa Award, 2020
- Finalist in the ICASSP 2020 Best paper award (4/730) and Best paper Student Award (8/1170) - coauthor
- IEEE Life Fellow, from January 1, 2019
- PIFI fellow, Visiting Scientist Award, Chinese Academy of Sciences, President’s International Fellowship Initiative (PIFI), 2018
- Member of “The Directors Team (2017, 2022)”
- The Kranzberg Chair in Signal Processing, TAU, 2016
- Honorary Fellow of the Open University, Israel, 2016
- 2011 SPS Signal Processing Magazine Best Column Award for Messer, H: "Rainfall Monitoring Using Cellular Networks"; [In the Spotlight], IEEE SIGNAL PROCESSING MAGAZINE, Vol. 24, No. 3, May 2007
- Panelist, United Nations commission on the status of women, fifty-fifth session, February 2011
- WIPO (World Intellectual Property Organization) Medal, 2009, "for the best invention to predict floods using cellular networks" (with N. David and P. Alpert).
- IEEE Geoscience and Remote Sensing Letters (GRSL) Best Reviewer Recognition for 2009
- General co-Chair, IEEE SAM-2010, IEEE HOS-1999 Workshops
- Member of the Editorial Board, Overview Articles in IEEE Signal Processing Transactions (2009-2012)
- Member of the Editorial Board, IEEE Journal on Selected Topics in Signal Processing (2006-2010)
- Fellow of the IEEE (2001): for contributions to statistical signal processing, time delay estimation and sensor array processing.
- Associate Editor, IEEE Signal Processing Letters (1996-9)
- Associate Editor, IEEE Trans. On Signal Processing (1994-6)
- Member, IEEE Signal Processing Society Technical Committees (SPTM, SAM) – 1994-2010.
- Best Teacher Award, Faculty of Engineering (1997)
- Plenary/keynotes talks in international conferences: SPAWC2007, SAM2008, SAM2012, EUCON2013, CEST2017, COMCAS2018, AICT2019, ICASSP2020, ICAS2021
