= Athula Attygalle =

Sri Lankan scientist

Athula Buddhagosha Attygalle
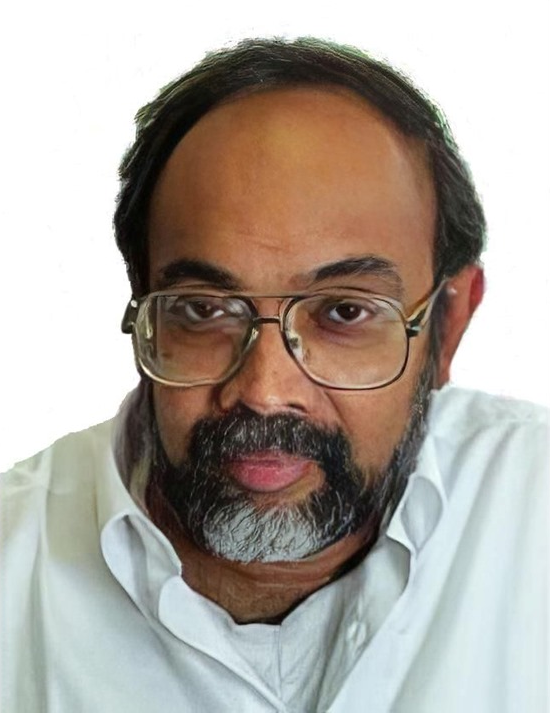
- Born: 1950 (age 75–76); Galle, Sri Lanka
- Occupation: Chemist

Academic background
- Education: Mahinda College, Galle; Keele University

Athula Buddhagosha Attygalle (Sinhala: අතුල ආටිගල) is a Sri Lankan scientist who works as a professor in the field of mass spectrometry in the United States. He was awarded the "Inventor of the Year" award in 2014 by the New Jersey Inventors Hall of Fame for his work in mass spectrometric analysis utilizing helium plasma and charge-exchange ionization techniques. In 2017 Attygalle won an Edison Patent Award from the Research and Development Council of New Jersey for his patented work in mass spectrometric analysis utilizing helium-plasma and charge-exchange ionization techniques, and the Arnold Berliner Award in 2021.

== Education ==
Attygalle had his primary and secondary education at Mahinda College in Galle, Sri Lanka. After his school education, he entered the University of Peradeniya and obtained a BSc in chemistry in 1972. He then joined the University of Colombo and received a MSc in biochemistry in 1977. After obtaining a postgraduate diploma in chemistry and chemical engineering from the Tokyo Institute of Technology, he obtained a PhD in chemistry from Keele University in 1983.

== Career ==
After his doctorate, Attygalle was awarded a fellowship by the Humboldt Foundation to conduct research at Friedrich-Alexander-Universität Erlangen-Nürnberg (FAU) under Hans Jürgen Bestmann, a pioneer in the field of insect pheromone synthesis. Four years at FAU provided the impetus for Attygalle to become an expert in high-resolution mass spectrometry and micro-chemical techniques for structure elucidation of natural compounds at nanogram level. At FAU, Attygalle championed in the area of lepidopteran sex pheromone identification. Attygalle was a visiting professor at University of Houston, Texas and he has served as the director of the mass spectrometry facility at Cornell University. He has completed work there in GC-MS regarding insect substances and their identifications. Currently Attygalle is attached to the Stevens Institute of Technology as a research professor in the Department of Chemistry and head of the mass spectrometry laboratory.

Attygalle was the recipient of the 2014 ‘Inventor of the Year’ award presented by the New Jersey Inventors Hall of Fame for his patented work in Mass Spectrometric Analysis utilizing Helium Plasma and charge exchange ionization techniques. Attygalle co-authored the 1999 article "Single-Site Catalysts for Ring-Opening Polymerization: Synthesis of Heterotactic Poly(lactic acid) from rac-Lactide" in the Journal of the American Chemical Society, which has been widely cited.

In July 2025, Attygalle will receive an honorary degrees from Keele University.
