= Dorin =

Dorin may refer to:

Romanian masculine given name

- Dorin Chirtoacă
- Dorin Cioabă
- Dorin Dănilă
- Dorin Drăguțanu
- Dorin Goian
- Dorin Junghietu
- Dorin Recean
- Dorin Rotariu
- Dorin Tudoran

Surname

- Françoise Dorin (1928–2018), French actor, comedian, novelist, playwright and songwriter; daughter of René
- René Dorin (1891-1969), French chansonnier, screenwriter and playwright
