= Ralph Izzo =

American businessman and former nuclear physicist

- Education: Columbia University (BS, MS, PhD)
- Occupations: Business executive, nuclear scientist
- Employer: Public Service Enterprise Group
- Known for: Chairman, President and CEO of PSEG
- Spouse: Karen Izzo
- Children: 2

Ralph Izzo is an American businessman and former nuclear physicist. He was the Chairman, President, and CEO of Public Service Enterprise Group, a Fortune 500 energy company headquartered in New Jersey. He is also the Chairman of the Nuclear Energy Institute, a nuclear industry trade association based in Washington, D.C. Izzo earned a Bachelor of Science, a Master of Science in mechanical engineering, and a doctorate in applied physics from Columbia University.

== Biography ==
The 1973 oil embargo influenced Izzo’s interest in fusion energy, which was seen as a way to reduce reliance on fossil fuels. He chose to attend Columbia University, which had a small fusion reactor with commercial potential. Izzo earned a Bachelor of Science in 1978, a Master of Science in mechanical engineering in 1979, and a doctorate in applied physics in 1981, all from Columbia University’s School of Engineering. While at Columbia, he also pitched for the varsity baseball team.

After receiving his PhD, Izzo began his career by joining the Princeton Plasma Physics Laboratory as a research scientist and worked there from 1981 to 1986. He then worked for Senator Bill Bradley as an American Physical Society Congressional Science Fellow to help shape public policy to secure funding for fusion labs. He also worked for Senator Thomas Kean for four years as a senior science policy advisor and was involved in the construction of the Hope Creek Nuclear Generating Station.

In 1992, he joined the Public Service Enterprise Group (PSEG) as vice president before being promoted to president and chief operating officer of Public Service Electric and Gas Company (PSE&G), an operating subsidiary of PSEG. He received an MBA from Rutgers University, with a concentration in finance, in 2002. He was named president and chief operating officer of the company and was named to the company's board of directors in 2006. In 2007, Izzo was appointed Chairman, and CEO of PSEG.

In June 2010, he was elected chair of Rutgers University's board of governors. In 2011, he was the class day speaker for Fu Foundation School of Engineering and Applied Science at Columbia University.

He has a been a member of the Fusion Energy Sciences Advisory Committee of the United States Department of Energy. From 2013 to 2016, he was a director of Williams Companies. He was also a director, and former chair of the New Jersey Chamber of Commerce, a director of Nuclear Electric Insurance Limited, Edison Electric Institute, and New Jersey Performing Arts Center. In August 2020, he was named a director of BNY Mellon.

== Subsidies controversy ==
During his time at PSEG, Izzo faced controversy over state subsidies for nuclear power. In 2018, PSEG requested financial support from New Jersey, stating that two of its nuclear plants would not be economically viable without it. The proposed subsidy, estimated at $300 million annually, drew criticism from competitors, advocacy groups, and the media. Some questioned whether a profitable company should receive public funds, and Izzo personally faced scrutiny.

Izzo defended the subsidy as necessary to maintain the state’s supply of carbon-free energy and to protect consumers from higher energy costs. He emphasized his duty to act in the best interest of shareholders and acknowledged the personal and professional challenges the debate created. Izzo maintained that the subsidy served New Jersey’s long-term energy goals.

In addition to the nuclear subsidy issue, Izzo dealt with regulatory disputes over energy efficiency programs and grid modernization. These efforts sometimes led to disagreements with state regulators and consumer advocates, particularly regarding proposed rates and compensation for revenue lost through efficiency improvements.

During the incident, Izzo, was "praised for his character and integrity by those who know him best in government and the business world, has essentially been called a liar, a fraud, a cheat and a crook by almost every special interest group and media," wrote news outlet ROI-NJ.

== Awards and honors ==
In 2010, Izzo was honored by the New Jersey Inventors Hall of Fame with its "Trustee Award." In 2012, he was honored by the National Italian American Foundation and received the NIAF Special Achievement Award in Science and Technology.

He serves on the Peddie School board of trustees.

== Corporate social responsibility (CSR) ==
Over the course of his career, Izzo’s views on corporate social responsibility developed. He increasingly supported companies speaking out on social and political issues such as climate change, voter access, and systemic racism, aligning with the growing expectations of employees and stakeholders.

== Personal life ==
Izzo is married to Karen Izzo, a retired biologist, and lives in Cranbury, New Jersey with his wife, and two kids.
