= Arthur Nobile =

American microbiologist (1920–2004)

Arthur Nobile (May 6, 1920 – January 13, 2004) was an American microbiologist. He is best known for his isolation and reproduction of the steroids prednisone and prednisolone.

== Early life ==
Arthur Nobile was born in Newark, New Jersey on May 6, 1920. He was a member of the U.S. Army Air Force during World War II, where he served in the Philippines.

== Education ==
Nobile studied at the University of Southern California and Washington State University before eventually earning his A.B. degree in Bacteriology from the University of California, Berkeley in 1950.

== Career ==
Nobile's work with the steroid drugs prednisone and prednisolone is widely considered one of the largest advances in 20th century medicine.

=== Recognition ===
Nobile was inducted into the New Jersey Inventors Hall of Fame in 2000 and the National Inventors Hall of Fame in 2007.
