= C. Frank Wheatley Jr. =

C. Frank Wheatley Jr. (1927, Baltimore, Maryland – October 18, 2014) was an electrical engineer responsible for a number of innovations within the semiconductor industry, including the patent of the insulated-gate bipolar transistor (IGBT). His work within the semiconductor industry garnered him a variety of awards, including his induction into the New Jersey Inventors Hall of Fame and election as an IEEE Fellow.

== Awards ==
The University of Maryland inducted Wheatley into the Hall of Fame of the A. James Clark School of Engineering. He has also received three awards from RCA, four from Harris Corporation, and five from the IEEE.

== Publications ==
His most cited publications, according to Google Scholar, are:

- CTitus JL, Wheatley CF. Experimental studies of single-event gate rupture and burnout in vertical power MOSFETs. IEEE Transactions on Nuclear Science. 1996 Apr;43(2):533-45. (cited 154 times)
- Brews JR, Allenspach M, Schrimpf RD, Galloway KF, Titus JL, Wheatley CF. A conceptual model of a single-event gate-rupture in power MOSFETs. IEEE transactions on nuclear science. 1993 Dec;40(6):1959-66. (cited 89 times)
