= George Feldstein =

American engineer and inventor

- Born: 1941; New York, New York, US
- Died: November 5, 2014 (aged 72–73); Cresskill, New Jersey, US
- Education: New York University (BS, MS)
- Occupations: Businessman; executive; electrical engineer; inventor

George Feldstein (born 1941 in Manhattan, New York, died November 5, 2014) was an engineer known for his contributions to audio-visual technologies. Feldstein was responsible for the creation of several audio and video control devices, such as a remote for 35mm projectors, the first HD digital touch panel, and the RF wireless control system. Feldstein holds 14 patents. Feldstein was the founder and CEO of Crestron Electronics, an audiovisual technologies company. Feldstein holds awards from InfoComm International and the New Jersey Inventors Hall of Fame for his contributions to the AV industry.

== Education ==
Feldstein received his B.S. in electronic engineering from New York University.
