= Endre Alexander Balázs =

Hungarian biochemist (1920–2015)

- Born: 10 January 1920; Budapest, Hungary
- Died: 29 August 2015 (aged 95); Saint-Tropez, France
- Education: University of Budapest
- Occupation: Doctor
- Known for: Hyaluronic acid
- Awards: Helen Keller Prize for Vision Research (2011)

Endre Alexander Balázs (10 January 1920 – 29 August 2015) was a Hungarian physician and inventor who transformed a natural lubricant into a palliative for arthritic knees as well as an important adjunct for cataract/IOL surgery now routinely used all over the world. He devoted seven decades to exploring the therapeutic potential of hyaluronic acid. He was inducted into the New Jersey Inventors Hall of Fame in 2012.

== Biography ==
He was born in 1920 in Budapest, Hungary. His father was an engineer at the Budapest Waterworks until the communist takeover after World War II.

He graduated from the University of Budapest in 1942 and started his research career at the Department of Histology and Embryology of the university. In 1947, he continued his research at the Karolinska Institutet in Stockholm, Sweden. He was the director of ophthalmic research at Columbia-Presbyterian Medical Center from 1975 to 1982.

He was the father of businessman André Balazs.

He died on 29 August 2015, aged 95, in Saint-Tropez, France.

== Philanthropy ==
He endowed a professorship at the Karolinska Institute.
