= Elwin Orton =

US plant biologist

Elwin Orton (January 8, 1930 - September 4, 2025) was a plant biologist known for his contributions in plant breeding techniques. He was known for saving the U.S. Dogwood plant through introduction of new pet-resistant hybrids, for which some were consequently named after him. His plant breeding work and conservation was recently recognized in the New Jersey Inventors Hall of Fame. Orton was a Professor Emeritus at Rutgers University, where he taught plant biology. Orton held 15 patents in dogwood and holly plant hybrid development.

== Education ==
Orton held a B.A. in horticulture from Penn State (1952), an M.A. in horticulture from Ohio State (1954), and a Ph.D. in plant genetics from the University of Wisconsin (1960).
