= Joseph Tabrikian =

Israeli electrical engineering professor

- ג’וזף טבריקיאן
- Born: 1964 (age 61–62); Iran
- Education: Tel-Aviv University
- Awards: IEEE fellow, fellow of Asia-Pacific Artificial Intelligence Association (AAIA)
- Scientific career
- Fields: Estimation theory, radar signal processing
- Workplaces: Ben Gurion University of the Negev, Duke University
- Thesis: Source localization in a multipath environment (1997)

Joseph Tabrikian (Hebrew: ג’וזף טבריקיאן; born August 5, 1964) is an Israeli professor in the School of Electrical and Computer Engineering at Ben-Gurion University of the Negev. He is the founder and former head of the School. He is a fellow of IEEE “For contributions to estimation theory and Multiple-Input Multiple-Output radars.”

== Early life and education ==
Joseph Tabrikian was born in Iran and immigrated to Israel in 1978. He received his B.Sc. (magna cum laude) and M.Sc. degrees in electrical engineering from Tel-Aviv University in 1986 and 1992, respectively.

In 1997 he received the Ph.D. degree from Tel-Aviv University. His Ph.D. thesis was on Source localization in a multipath environment, supervised by Prof. Hagit Messer-Yaron.

== Career ==
Tabrikian was an assistant research professor at the Department of Electrical and Computer Engineering (ECE) of Duke University during 1996 and 1998. He then joined the Department of Electrical and Computer Engineering of Ben-Gurion University of the Negev as a faculty member. Tabrikian was the department head from 2017 to 2019. In May 2019 he led a major organizational change by merging 3 departments and established the school of Electrical and Computer Engineering at Ben-Gurion University of the Negev. He served as the school head till August 2021.

He held visiting academic positions at the University of Illinois in Chicago and at Duke University.

During the years, Tabrikian has supervised more than 50 graduate students. The following faculty members in Israeli universities were among his M.Sc. and/or Ph.D. students: Tirza Routtenberg (Ben-Gurion University), Yair Noam (Bar-Ilan University), Koby Todros (Ben Gurion University), Igal Bilik (Ben-Gurion University), and Wasim Huleihel (Tel-Aviv University).

== Research ==
Tabrikian’s research work focuses on estimation and detection theory, learning algorithms, and radar signal processing. He became known for his contributions to fundamentals of estimation theory and for radar signal processing.

In 2004, Tabrikian together with his M.Sc. student, Ilya Bekkerman, introduced the technology of collocated Multiple-Input Multiple-Output (MIMO) radar, where the concept of virtual sensors was introduced via transmission of orthogonal signals. This technology is now widely used in most radar systems, such as automotive radars. He contributed to the field of radar systems via various publications and patents in several directions, such as, cognitive radar, artificial intelligence for radars, target classification, and automotive radar.

Tabrikian has contributed to the field of Estimation Theory by proposing several fundamental bounds for easy and reliable prediction of performances of estimators in the Bayesian and non-Bayesian frameworks. His contributions to this field include:

Todros-Tabrikian – bounds with linear transformation of the likelihood function.

Routtenberg-Tabrikian - bounds for periodic parameter estimation.

Bar-Tabrikian - bounds for parameter estimation in the presence of nuisance parameters.

Aharon-Tabrikian – bound with arbitrary test-point transformation.

Tabrikian has authored over 170 scientific publications, and patents.

== Recognition ==
Tabrikian is fellow of IEEE for Contributions to Estimation Theory and MIMO Radars and a fellow of Asia-Pacific Artificial Intelligence Association (AAIA). He also received several best paper awards.

Tabrikian has served as a senior area editor and associate editor of IEEE Transactions on Signal Processing and of the IEEE Signal Processing Letters. He was also a Guest Editor for the IEEE Transactions on Aerospace and Electronic Systems.

Tabrikian was a member of several IEEE Technical Committees, and since 2021 he is the official representative of Israel to URSI Commission C: Radio communication Systems and Signal Processing.

== Publications ==
=== Selected articles ===
- O. Aharon and J. Tabrikian, "A class of Bayesian lower bounds for parameter estimation via Arbitrary test-point transformation," IEEE Transactions on Signal Processing, vol. 71, pp. 2296-2308, June 2023.
- I. Bilik, O. Longman, S. Villeval, and J. Tabrikian "The rise of radar for autonomous vehicles: Signal processing solutions and future research directions," IEEE Signal Processing Magazine, vol. 36, no. 5, pp. 20-31, September 2019.
- S. Bar and J. Tabrikian, "Bayesian estimation in the presence of deterministic nuisance parameters—Part I: Performance bounds," IEEE Transactions on Signal Processing, vol. 63, no. 24, pp. 6632-6646, December 2015.
- T. Routtenberg and J. Tabrikian, "Non-Bayesian periodic Cramér-Rao bound," IEEE Transactions on Signal Processing, vol. 61, no. 4, pp. 1019-1032, February 2013.
- W. Huleihel, J. Tabrikian, and R. Shavit "Optimal adaptive waveform design for cognitive MIMO radar," IEEE Transactions on Signal Processing, vol. 61, no. 20, pp. 5075-5089, October 2013.
- K. Todros and J. Tabrikian, "General classes of performance lower bounds for parameter estimation - Part I: non-Bayesian bounds for unbiased estimators," IEEE Transactions on Information Theory, vol. 56, no. 10, pp. 5045-5063, October 2010.
- I. Bilik, J. Tabrikian, and A. Cohen, "GMM-based target classification for ground surveillance Doppler radar," IEEE Transactions on Aerospace and Electronics Systems, vol. 42, no. 1, pp. 267-278, January 2006.
- I. Bekkerman and J. Tabrikian, "Target detection and localization using MIMO radars and sonars," IEEE Transactions on Signal Processing, vol. 54, no. 10, pp. 3873-3883, October 2006.
- D. Rahamim, J. Tabrikian, and R. Shavit, "Source localization using vector sensor array in a multipath environment," IEEE Transactions on Signal Processing, vol. 52, no. 11, pp. 3096-3103, November 2004.
- J. Tabrikian and J. L. Krolik, "Barankin bounds for source localization in an uncertain ocean environment," IEEE Transactions on Signal Processing, vol. 47, no. 11, pp. 2917-2927, November 1999.

== Personal life ==
He is married to Michal. They have two children and live in Tel-Aviv.
