= Lanny Smoot =

African American inventor (born 1955)

Lanny S. Smoot
- Born: December 13, 1955 (age 70)
- Education: Columbia University; Brooklyn Technical High School
- Occupations: Engineer and Inventor
- Employer: Walt Disney Imagineering

Lanny Smoot (born December 13, 1955) is an American electrical engineer, inventor, scientist, and theatrical technology creator. With over 100 patents, he is Disney's most prolific inventor and one of the most prolific Black inventors in American history. Throughout his career he has worked to inspire young people, especially Black youth, towards STEM.

== Biography ==
Lanny was born in Brooklyn, NY, USA, and later attended Brooklyn Technical High School. He attended Columbia University, supported by a Bell Labs Engineering Scholarship and received his Bachelor's degree in Electrical Engineering. He then started work at Bell Communications Research (Bellcore), and while working at Bell (later Telcordia), he also completed his Master's Degree in Electrical Engineering from Columbia. Smoot worked at Bell for two decades, where his mentors included James West, co-inventor of the electret microphone. Around 2000, he moved to Disney where he is currently a Disney Research Fellow.

== Notable work ==
At Bell, Smoot was known for his work on early development of video-on-demand and other video and fibre-optic technology. He anticipated a future where anyone could broadcast video.

At Disney, Smoot's accomplishments include the drive system for the Star Wars BB-8 droid, interactive zoetropes for facial animation of objects, eye imaging for superhero masks and helmets, “Where’s the Fire?” at Innoventions (Epcot), many Haunted Mansion special effects, virtual interactive koi ponds in Hong Kong Disneyland, Fortress Explorations at Tokyo DisneySea, Power City" in Spaceship Earth (Epcot), and lightsabers for the Star Wars: Galactic Starcruiser experience. Other patented inventions include new ride technology and glassless 3D displays.

== Recognition pp ==
1973 - National Achievement Scholarship Award.
1987 - Most Promising Engineer Award at the first Black Engineer of the Year Awards (BEYA), for significant contributions to the fields of optical communications and broadband networks, as well as consistent contributions to affirmative action activities.
1996 - New Jersey Inventors Hall of Fame Inventor of the Year.

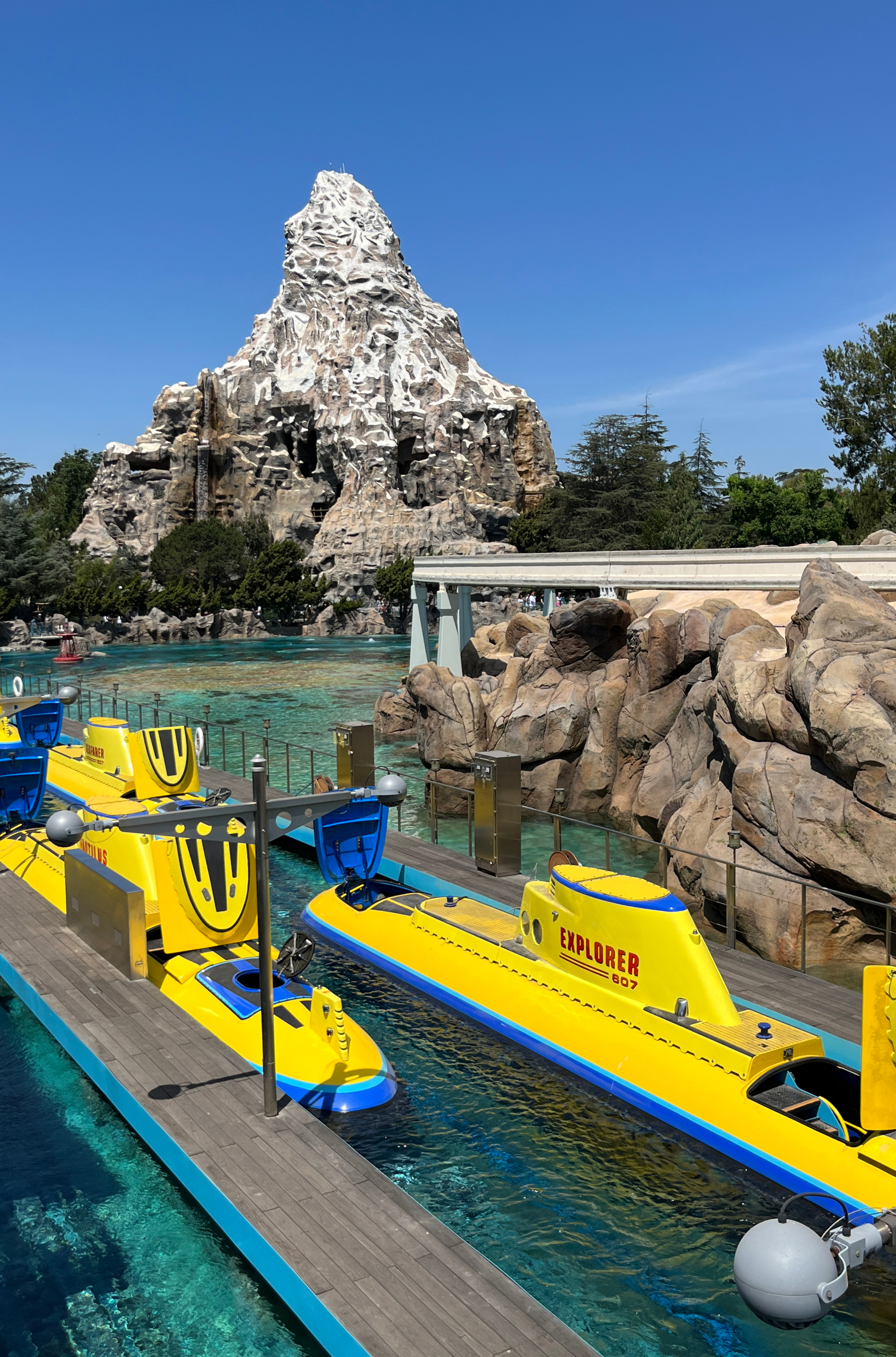
Finding Nemo Submarine Voyage, one of Smoot's award winning projects

2008 - Themed Entertainment Association Thea Awards for Finding Nemo Submarine Voyage (Disneyland, Anaheim), and Kim Possible World Showcase Playtest, Epcot, Florida.
2017 - Themed Entertainment Association Thea Award for "Ghost Post – Recognized for effects consulting for this “beyond the berm” experience inspired by the Haunted Mansion attraction".
2020 - Themed Entertainment Association TEA Master (Theatrical Technology) "From Madame Leota’s levitating crystal ball… to special effects for Kim Possible’s park-wide scavenger hunts… to Luke Skywalker’s glowing lightsaber… Lanny Smoot has created some of the most magical special effects and technical achievements for Disney’s theme parks and resorts worldwide."
2022 - United States Patent and Trademark Office Inventor of the Month
2022 - Featured in National Inventors Hall of Fame exhibit on "Breaking Barriers: Honoring Extraordinary Black Inventors"
2024 - Inducted into the National Inventors Hall of Fame, for his work on theatrical technologies and special effects. Smoot is first Disney inventor to be inducted after Walt Disney, who was inducted in 2000 for the invention of the Multiplane camera
