= Sidney Pestka =

Polish-American biochemist and geneticist (1936–2016)

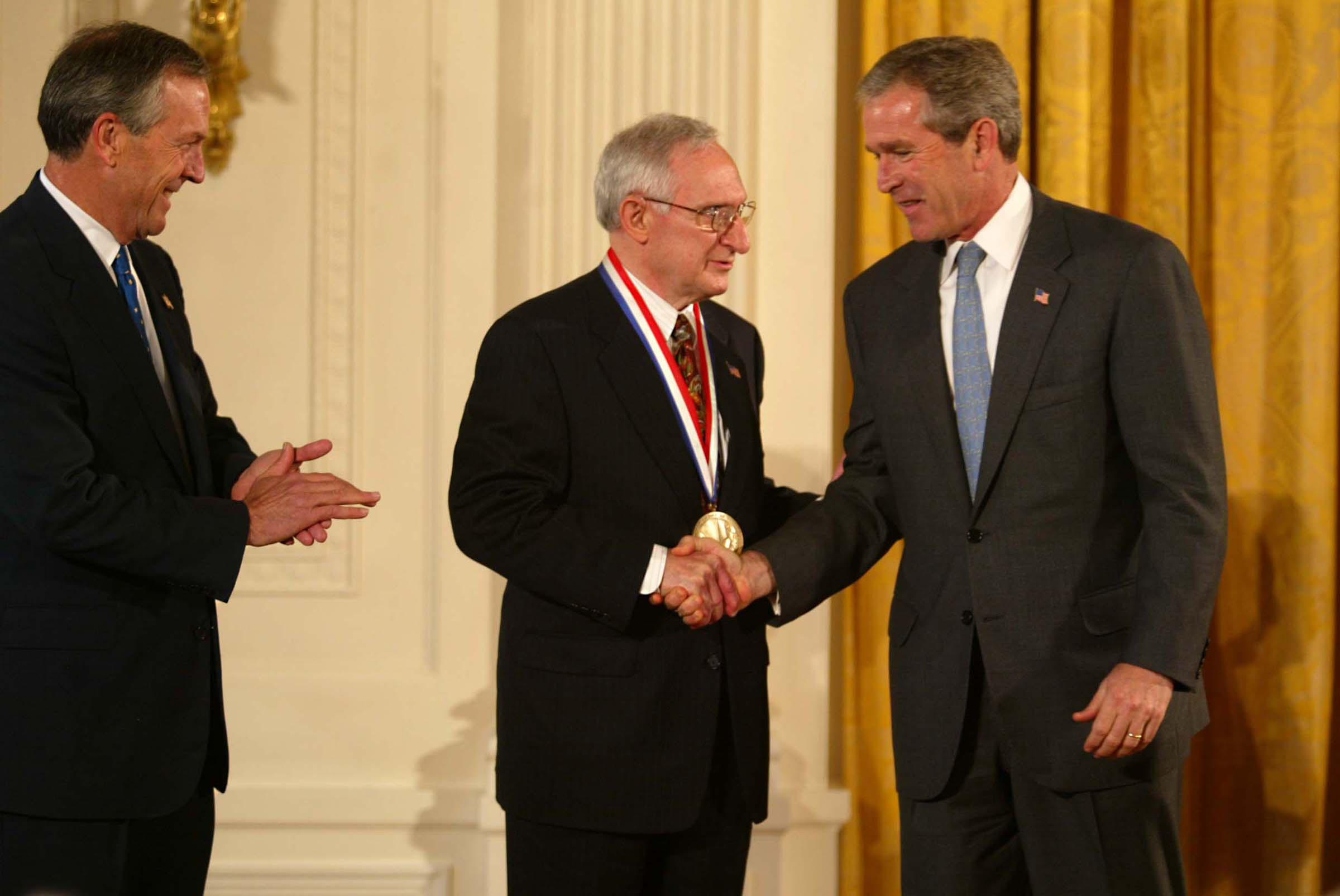
- Sidney Pestka (middle) receives the National Medal of Technology from President George W. Bush (right)
- Born: 29 May 1936; Drobin, Płock County, Poland
- Died: 22 December 2016 (aged 80)
- Education: Princeton University; University of Pennsylvania
- Awards: 1977 Selman A. Waksman Award in Microbiology; 2001 National Medal of Technology; 2001 Seymour and Vivian Milstein Award; 2003 Warren Alpert Prize; 2006 Lemelson–MIT Prize Lifetime Achievement Award
- Scientific career
- Workplaces: National Heart Institute; National Cancer Institute; Roche Institute of Molecular Biology; Robert Wood Johnson Medical School; PBL Assay Science

Sidney Pestka (May 29, 1936 – December 22, 2016) was an American biochemist and geneticist. A recipient of the National Medal of Technology, he is sometimes referred to as the "father of interferon" for his groundbreaking work developing the interferons as treatments for major diseases such as hepatitis, multiple sclerosis, and cancer. Pestka was part of the team working on research involving the genetic code, protein synthesis and ribosome function that led to the 1968 Nobel Prize in Physiology or Medicine received by Marshall Warren Nirenberg. Pestka died on December 22, 2016, at the age of 80.

== Early life and education ==
Sidney Pestka was born on May 29, 1936, in the Polish town of Drobin, which is located in what is now known as Płock County ("powiat płocki"). His family emigrated to the United States a few years later. When he was a young boy, he began inventing devices. "It was stimulating to see chemicals change the color of fluids, to construct crystal radios, and to make caramel from sugar—however, my mother’s pots and pans were never the same afterward. It seemed that I constantly thought about new ideas to implement. As a teenager I developed an electronic security key and many other devices, but I did not know about patents at that time." Both his parents encouraged his curiosity; his mother taught him mathematics when he was very young and his father shared his own hobby of building bicycles with basic parts.

In 1957, he graduated summa cum laude from Princeton University with a degree in chemistry. He went on to the University of Pennsylvania School of Medicine and completed his MD in 1961. Dr. Pestka completed his pediatric and medical internship at Baltimore City Hospital, after which he joined the National Heart Institute in 1962. Here he worked in the laboratory of Dr. Marshall W. Nirenberg, winner of the Nobel Prize in Physiology or Medicine in 1968 for "breaking the genetic code."

== Research ==
While in the Nirenberg Laboratory, he discovered how the genetic code of the mRNA is translated into protein through the small ribosomal subunit, a discovery that was contrary to the scientific thinking at that time. This early work helped create new fundamental tenets about the mechanism of protein biosynthesis and antibiotic action.

In 1966, he moved to the National Cancer Institute, where for three years he continued his research on protein synthesis, and began investigations in other areas. It was here that he first learned about interferons. Scientists first observed interferon in the 1950s, and when they learned that human cells secreted the substance it was postulated that interferon could hold the key to beneficial antiviral properties. Pestka became very interested in interferon.

For the next 16 years, he worked ways to produce clinically relevant quantities of interferon at reasonable cost. Among other advances, he developed reversed phase HPLC for the purification of proteins. Until that time, it was believed that reversed phase HPLC would denature proteins. He also developed the procedure to clone interferons. These advances led to the first recombinant biotherapeutic, Roferon-A, an alpha interferon.

== Work ==
In 1969, he joined the Roche Institute of Molecular Biology in Nutley, New Jersey, where he initiated the work on interferon.

His work with IFN-α has led to cancer therapy with interferons and the use of interferon for the treatment of chronic Hepatitis B and Hepatitis C preventing development of liver cancer due to hepatitis. IFN-α is approved for treatment of a number of cancers and is the only approved treatment for advanced melanoma. His developments related to IFN-β led to its use for the treatment of multiple sclerosis.

From 1986 to 2011, he served as Professor and Chairman of the Department of Molecular Genetics, Microbiology and Immunology at UMDNJ-Robert Wood Johnson Medical School in Piscataway, New Jersey. With his wife Joan Pestka, in 1990 he founded PBL Assay Science, a company focused on helping researchers solve difficult assay development and protein quantification problems. The company initially supplied interferon proteins and antibodies to research scientists, reagents that Pestka had developed over the course of his scientific career but were not readily available. The company later developed a line of interferon ELISA immunoassay kits, human cell-expressed cytokines, and growth factor offerings, and expanded assay services capabilities to include ultrasensitive cytokine detection services. At the time of his death he was Emeritus Professor of the Department of Biochemistry and Molecular Biology at Robert Wood Johnson Medical School of Rutgers, The State University of New Jersey.

== Patents ==
While at the Roche Institute of Molecular Biology, he generated a large portfolio of groundbreaking patents for Hoffmann-La Roche. In 1993, he was inducted into the New Jersey Inventors Hall of Fame. His work is the basis for a number of U.S. and foreign patents. Interferon is a major product of several U.S. and foreign companies many of which license interferon under his patents, including Schering-Plough, Hoffmann-La Roche, Amgen, Biogen and Berlex.

== Awards and honors ==
At a White House ceremony in June 2002, President George W. Bush honored him with the 2001 National Medal of Technology. He was cited for his "pioneering achievements that led to the development of the biotechnology industry, to the first recombinant interferons for the treatment of cancers, leukemias, viral diseases such as hepatitis B and C, and multiple sclerosis; to fundamental technologies leading to other biotherapeutics; and for basic scientific discoveries in chemistry, biochemistry, genetic engineering and molecular biology from protein biosynthesis to receptors and cell signaling." He also received the 1977 Selman A. Waksman Award in Microbiology, the 2001 Seymour and Vivian Milstein Award from the International Society for Interferon and Cytokine Research, the 2003 Warren Alpert Prize from Harvard, and the 2006 Lemelson-MIT Lifetime Achievement Award, the 2009 Molecular Biology Medal from the National Institutes of Health for his role in deciphering the genetic code and the mechanism of protein synthesis, and the 2010 Edward J. Ill Outstanding Medical Research Scientist Award for Basic Biomedical Research.

== Publications ==
He has published over 600 articles in peer-reviewed journals. He has edited five books, three of which are classic reference books about interferons in the Methods in Enzymology series.

- "Molecular Mechanisms of Protein Biosynthesis (Molecular Biology)" (Academic Press, 1977) ISBN 0-12-744250-2
- "Methods in Enzymology Volume 78: Interferons, Part A" (Academic Press, 1981) ASIN B002JBOWGG
- "Methods in Enzymology Volume 79: Interferons, Part B" (Academic Press, 1982) ISBN 0-12-181979-5
- "Methods in Enzymology Volume 119: Interferons Part C" (Academic Press, 1986) ISBN 0-12-182019-X
- "Cytokine Yearbook Volume 1" (Springer, 1996) ISBN 0-7923-3876-6
