= Disney Research =

Research labs supporting The Walt Disney Company

- Established: August 11, 2008; 18 years ago
- Field of research: Computer graphics, video processing, computer vision, robotics
- Location: Los Angeles, United States; Zurich, Switzerland
- Affiliations: ETH Zurich
- Website: disneyresearch.com

Disney Research is a network of research labs supporting The Walt Disney Company. Its purpose is to pursue scientific and technological innovation to advance the company's broad media and entertainment efforts.

It has facilities in Los Angeles, Zurich and Edinburgh. Research topics include computer graphics, video processing, computer vision, robotics, radio and antennas, wireless communications, human-computer interaction, displays, data mining, machine learning, and behavioral sciences. The lab in Cambridge, Massachusetts was closed in January 2016.

Disney Research is managed by an internal Disney Research Council co-chaired by Disney-Pixar's Ed Catmull and including the directors of the individual labs.

== Notable works ==
Below are some notable works from Disney Research:

- BB-8 was a physical prop created by special effects artist Neal Scanlan
- The HoloTile Floor was created by Disney Imagineer Lanny Smoot as a mechanical surface that allows a person to simulate walking while remaining stationary, akin to an omnidirectional treadmill, to create the illusion of walking

== See also ==
- Walt Disney Imagineering
