= Kamlesh =

Kamlesh or Kamalesh is a given name which may refer to:

- Kamlesh Khunti, British physician
- Kamlesh Kumari (died 2001), police constable who thwarted a terrorist attack on the Parliament of India; posthumous recipient of the Ashoka Chakra Award, India's highest peacetime award
- Kamlesh Oza, Indian television actor
- Kamlesh Patel, Baron Patel of Bradford (born 1960), British politician and life peer
- Kamlesh Pattni, Kenyan businessman
- Kamlesh Reddy, Fijian politician
- Kamalesh Sharma (born 1941), Secretary General of the Commonwealth of Nations
- Kamalesh Sirkar, professor of chemical engineering and inventor
- Kamlesh Tiwari (died 2019), former Indian politician and founder of the Hindu Samaj Party
