= Yeheskel Bar-Ness =

American electrical engineer

- יחזקאל בר-נס
- Born: April 28, 1932; Al Diwaniyah, Iraq
- Died: July 1, 2024 (aged 92)
- Resting place: Bloomfield-Cooper Jewish Chapels
- Education: Brown University
- Engineering career
- Discipline: Applied mathematics Electrical engineering
- Institutions: New Jersey Institute of Technology; Tel Aviv University; University of Pennsylvania
- Significant advance: Adaptive multiuser detection, array processing and interference cancellation, and wireless mobile and personal communications
- Awards: Fellow of the IEEE; Inventor of the Year by the New Jersey Inventors Hall of Fame (2006); NJIT Excellence in Research Lifetime Achievement Award (2014)

Yeheskel Bar-Ness (Hebrew: יחזקאל בר-נס) was a Distinguished Professor Emeritus at New Jersey Institute of Technology (NJIT).

== Education ==
Bar-Ness received a bachelor's and a master's degree in electrical engineering from the Technion in Haifa, Israel, and a doctorate from Brown University.

== Career ==
Bar-Ness published more than 200 papers in his professional life over 40 year. He had one U.S. patent on smart antennas.

His research was funded by the National Science Foundation, the New Jersey Commission on Science and Technology, the United States Army, the United States Air Force and the Naval Oceanic Center.

He was the Founding Editor-in Chief of the journal of IEEE Communications Letters.

He made research contributions on adaptive multiuser detection, array processing and interference cancellation, and wireless mobile and personal communications.

Bar-Ness died July 1, 2024.

== Honors and awards ==
- Fellow of the Institute of Electrical and Electronics Engineers (IEEE) for contributions to the advancement of coherent communications and array processing for interference cancellation.
- Recipient of the Kaplan Prize (1973).
- Named an Inventor of the Year by the New Jersey Inventors Hall of Fame (2006).
- NJIT Excellence in Research Lifetime Achievement Award (2014)

== Doctoral students ==
According to the Mathematics Genealogy Project, Bar-Ness advised 23 doctoral students at Tel Aviv University, University of Pennsylvania and New Jersey Institute of Technology.
