= Salvatore Salamone =

Scientist and researcher

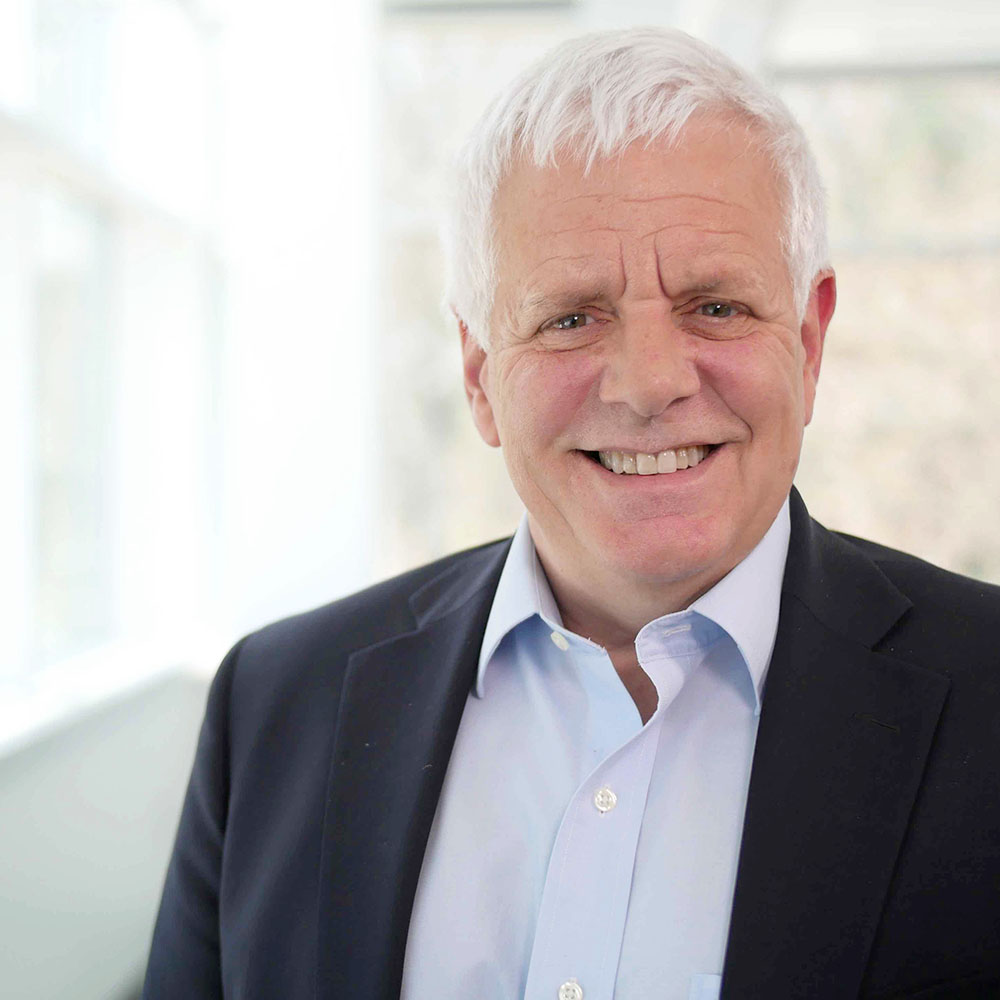
Portrait photograph of Salvatore J. Salamone, PhD, taken at Saladax Biomedical, Inc.

Salvatore Salamone is a scientist and researcher studying diagnostic medicine and therapeutic drug monitoring.

== Education ==
Salamone earned two bachelor's degrees from Villanova University, a master's and a PhD degree from Rutgers University and was a Science Engineering Research Council (SERC) Post-Doctoral Fellow at the University of Oxford, UK.

== Career ==
Salamore is responsible for the development of many of the major reagents used within psychiatric drug level monitoring. He is the founder of Saladax Biomedical, Inc. His contributions to diagnostic medicine have been recognized through several local awards, including the Ben Franklin Innovation Award and the New Jersey Inventors Hall of Fame in 2016. Salamone has 70 FDA-approved products and more than 200 instrument applications. He is the editor of a textbook on benzodiazapines and is also the holder of 41 issued US patents. The International Association of Therapeutic Drug Monitoring and Clinical Toxicology (IATDMCT) awarded Salamone the C.E. Pippenger Award for outstanding contributions to the field of Therapeutic Drug Monitoring in 2021.
