= Research and Development Council of New Jersey =

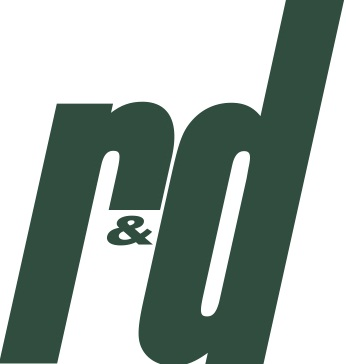
Logo

The Research & Development Council of New Jersey is a nonprofit organization which advocates for progress in various research and development sectors in the state of New Jersey. Its membership includes representatives from academia, industry, and government. Members of the council are offered services such as policy analysis and recent news in the fields of science research. The Research & Development Council of New Jersey was the principal fundraiser for the construction of the Liberty Science Center, and it also funds a dozen scholarships for New Jersey students yearly. The organization was established in 1962 and is based in Newark.

== Leadership ==
The Research and Development Council of NJ is led by a board of directors with Dr. Ian Shankland of Honeywell Specialty Materials acting as chairman. The Vice Chairwoman is Dr. Kathleen Scotto of the University of Medicine & Dentistry of NJ. The President is Anthony S. Cicatiello of CN Communications International Inc. The Secretary is Dr. Waseem Malick of Roche, Inc. and the Treasurer is Dr. Robert Zivin of Johnson & Johnson. The Board also includes industry, academic, and New Jersey state representatives.

== Member companies ==
Membership companies include the following:

- Bristol-Myers Squibb Company
- ExxonMobil Research & Engineering Company
- General Magnaplate Corporation
- GlaxoSmithKline
- Honeywell Specialty Materials
- Johnson & Johnson
- Lexicon Pharmaceuticals
- Merck Research Laboratories
- Montclair State University
- New Jersey Economic Development Authority
- New Jersey Institute of Technology
- Hoffman-La Roche
- Rutgers, The State University of New Jersey,

US Army ARDEC, and US Army REDCOM.

== Awards ==
=== Thomas Alva Edison Patent Awards ===
Each year, the R&D Council of New Jersey honors noteworthy efforts of scientists and inventors, as well as their organizations, with the Thomas Alva Edison Patent Award. The Research & Development Council of New Jersey deemed it most fitting to pay homage to one of New Jersey's greatest inventors by naming its patent award in his honor. The Council gives the Award to inventors in New Jersey for their patents on scientific breakthroughs.

In 2010, the Council selected 8 patent awards, and recognized over 30 inventors. The 2010 award recipients were Alcatel-Lucent Bell Labs, ExxonMobil, NJIT, Rutgers, the State University of New Jersey, BASF, Lexicon Pharmaceuticals, Osteotech, and Stevens Institute of Technology. Award recipients participated in short films explaining their innovations.

=== Chairman's Award ===
The Research & Development Council of New Jersey's Chairman's Award was created in 2001 to honor individuals for outstanding effort and leadership in uniting industry and academia in the pursuit of creating a research-based economy in New Jersey.

The 2011 Award Recipient was Congressman Rodney Frelinghuysen. The 2010 Award Recipient was Former Governor Tom Kean. Governor Kean was rated among America's five most effective state leaders by Newsweek magazine, noted especially for the more than 30 education reforms he oversaw during his tenure. The 2009 Award Recipient was Emlyn Koster, President & CEO of the Liberty Science Center.

=== Educator of the Year ===
The Research & Development Council's Educator of the Year Award was first awarded in 2000 to honor representatives from academia for support of industry, academia and government interactions.

The 2011 Award Recipient was Dr. Herman J. Saatkamp, Jr., President of Stockton University. The 2010 Award Recipient was Dr. Carlo Parravano from the Merck Institute for Science Education. As executive director of the Merck Institute for Science Education (MISE), Dr. Carlo Parravano is responsible for the planning, development and implementation of numerous initiatives aimed towards improving STEM education. During Parravano's 16-year tenure, student performance improved in partner districts, and MISE worked closely with districts to introduce common education standards. The 2009 Award Recipient was Dr. Edward Yaw, President of the County College of Morris.

=== The Research & Development Council Merit Scholarships ===
The Research & Development Council awards an annual scholarship to outstanding New Jersey students. The award is given to students pursuing a major in the sciences, technology, engineering, or math (STEM) fields based on their academic excellence and financial need. Award Recipients also partake in a function with panels led by education experts and Research & Development professionals from various R&D Council Members.

=== Science & Technology Medal ===
The Research & Development Council of New Jersey's Science and Technology Medal was created in 1980 and is awarded annually to a leader of a technology-based company or a university for "extraordinary performance in bringing innovation from the laboratory to the market place."

The 2011 Award Recipients were Nancy Thornberry and Dr. Ann Weber, the leaders behind the development of Merck's Januvia. The 2010 Award Recipient was Dr. George E. Smith. Dr. Smith received one-quarter share of a Nobel Prize in Physics for the invention of an imaging semiconductor unit, his work paved the way for affordable camcorders and scanning equipment. The 2009 Award Recipients were Eliot Sigal, the Chief Scientific Officer of Bristol-Myers Squibb and the President of R&D; the award was also given to President Barack Obama, in absentia. The 2016 award was given to Marcus Weldon, President of Bell Labs and Chief Technology Officer of Nokia, for his technology vision and leadership.
