= Eugene I. Gordon =

American physicist

Eugene Irving Gordon
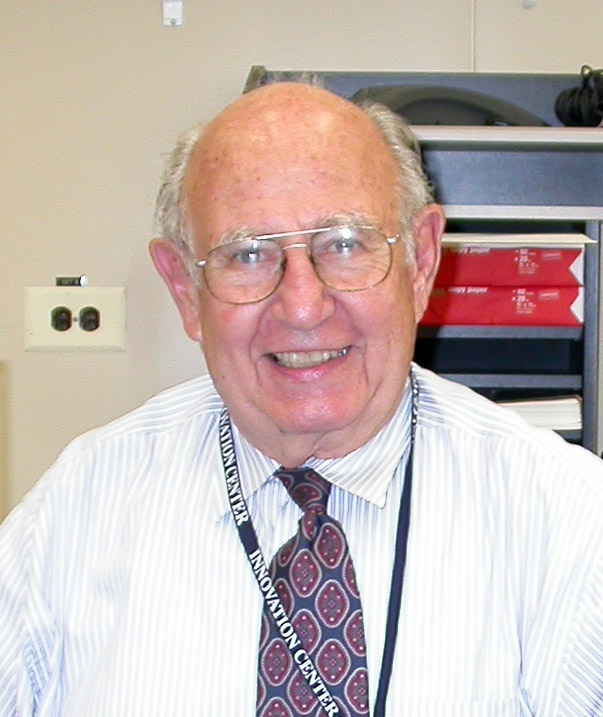
- Eugene Irving Gordon
- Born: September 14, 1930; New York, New York
- Died: September 15, 2014 (aged 84); Scotch Plains, New Jersey
- Education: City College of New York; Massachusetts Institute of Technology
- Awards: IEEE Edison Medal (1984)
- Scientific career
- Fields: Physics

Eugene Irving Gordon (September 14, 1930 – September 15, 2014) was an American physicist. He was Director of the Lightwave Devices Laboratory of Bell Labs.

== Biography ==
Gordon was born on September 14, 1930, in New York City. He graduated from the City College of New York in 1952 with a B.S. in physics, and completed his Ph.D. from the Massachusetts Institute of Technology in 1957. He became director of the Lightwave Devices Laboratory of Bell Labs. He married Renate Albrecht on December 31, 1991. He died on September 15, 2014, in Scotch Plains, New Jersey.

== Honors and awards ==
- IEEE Edison Medal in 1984
- member, National Academy of Engineering in 1978
- IEEE Vladimir K. Zworykin Award in 1975
- Fellow, IEEE 1968
