= Florin Cioabă =

Romanian Pentecostal minister

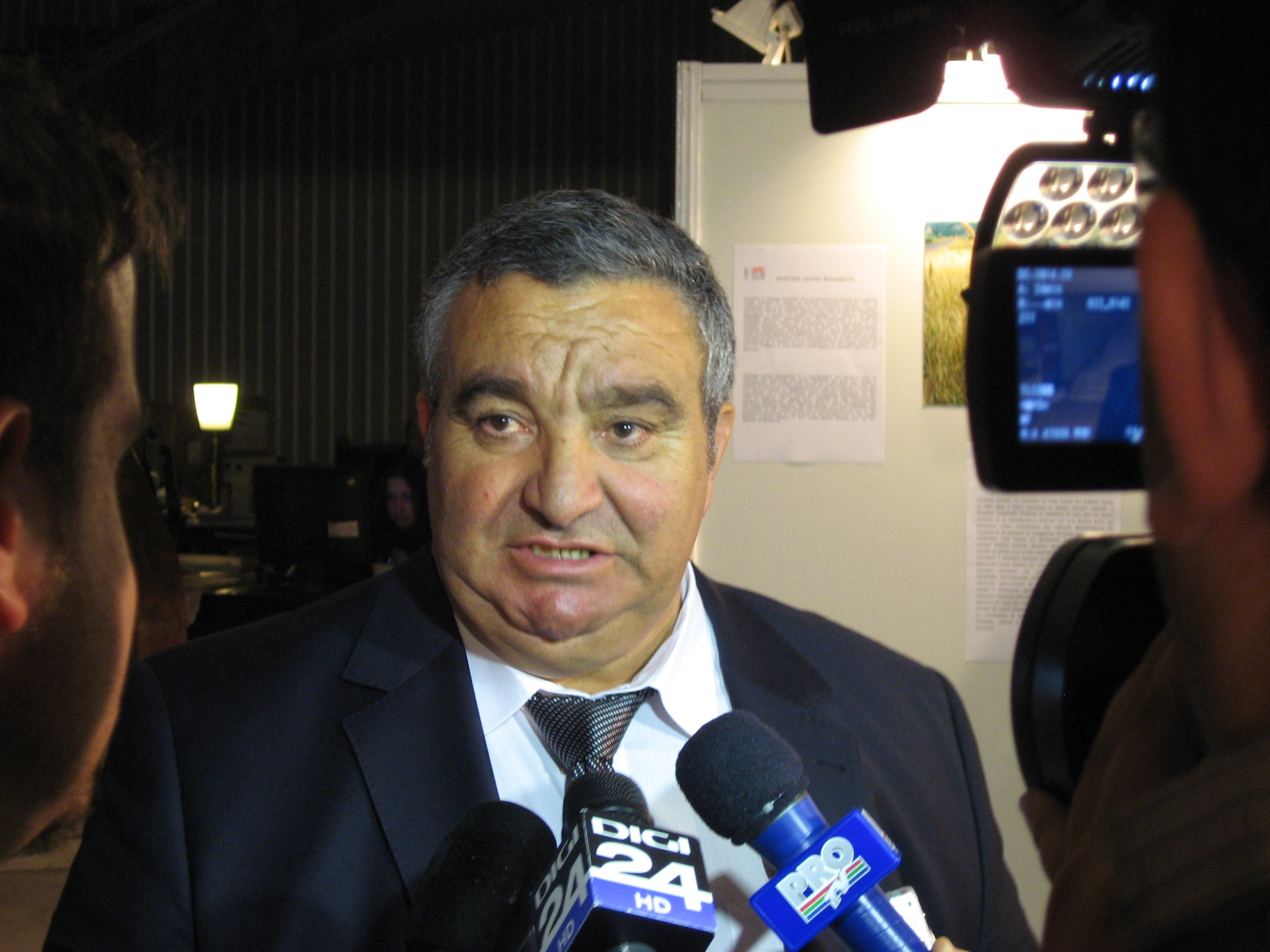
- Cioabă in 2012

King of the Roma Everywhere (self-proclaimed)
- In office 1997 – August 18, 2013
- Preceded by: Ion Cioabă (his father)
- Succeeded by: Dorin Cioabă (his son)

Personal details
- Born: Florin Tănase Cioabă; November 14, 1954 Romania
- Died: August 18, 2013 (aged 58) Akdeniz University, Antalya, Turkey
- Profession: Pentecostal minister

Florin Tănase Cioabă (14 November 1954 – 18 August 2013) was a Romanian Roma Pentecostal minister and self-proclaimed "King of Roma Everywhere". He was the son of Ion Cioabă, a Kalderash Roma leader. He died on 18 August 2013 of cardiac arrest at Akdeniz University in Antalya in Turkey. He was 58 years old.
