= Kamalesh Sirkar =

American chemical engineer

Kamalesh K. Sirkar is a Distinguished Professor of Chemical Engineering at New Jersey Institute of Technology (NJIT) in Newark, New Jersey, USA. He is also the Foundation Professor of'Membrane Separations and Director of the NJIT Center for Membrane Technologies. He is internationally recognized as an expert in membrane separation technologies.

== Education ==
Sirkar received his B.Tech. from the Indian Institute of Technology at Kharagpur and both his MS and PhD from the University of Illinois at Urbana-Champaign.

== Career ==
Sirkar was previously a Professor of Chemical Engineering at Stevens Institute of Technology and Indian Institute of Technology at Kanpur prior to arriving at NJIT in 1992.

== His accomplishments ==
Sirkar is the holder of 25 U.S. patents.
He has also authored 156 refereed articles and 18 book chapters, and is a co-editor of the widely used Membrane Handbook.
He is the Editor of the Elsevier series Membrane Science and Technology and an Associate Editor of Separation Science and Technology.
He has served (or is serving) on the editorial boards of the Journal of Membrane Science, Industrial and Engineering Chemistry Research and Separation Science and Technology.

== Honors and awards ==
Sirkar has received numerous honors and awards throughout his research life. Some of these include:

- Kirkpatrick Award (1991).
- Honorary Fellow of Indian Institute of Chemical Engineers (2001).
- American Institute of Chemical Engineers's Institute Award for excellence in Industrial Gases Technology (2005).
- Thomas Alva Edison Patent Award in the Environmental Category of the Research and Development Council (2006).
- Fellow of American Association for the Advancement of Science (AAAS) in 2008.
- Clarence Gerhold Award of the Separations Division of AIChE (2008).
- NJIT Excellence in Research Prize & Medal (2009).
- New Jersey Inventors Hall of Fame Innovators Award (2009).
