= Tomorrow.io =

American weather technology company

- Formerly: ClimaCell
- Type: Private
- Industry: Weather forecasting; Earth observation
- Founded: 2016
- Founders: Shimon Elkabetz; Itai Zlotnik; Rei Goffer
- Headquarters: Boston, Massachusetts, U.S.
- Area served: Worldwide
- Key people: Shimon Elkabetz (Co-founder, CEO); Rei Goffer (Co-founder, CSO); Itai Zlotnik (Co-founder)
- Products: Weather Intelligence Platform; Weather API; Insights Dashboard; DeepSky satellite constellation; Weather by Tomorrow (consumer app)
- Revenue: ~US$100 million ARR (2026)
- Number of employees: ~218 (2026)
- Website: tomorrow.io

Tomorrow.io (formerly ClimaCell; legally known as The Tomorrow Companies Inc.) is an American weather technology company headquartered in Boston, Massachusetts. The company provides a weather intelligence and climate adaptation platform combining proprietary satellite data, artificial intelligence, and real-time forecasting for enterprises and governments. Its customers include major airlines, space agencies including NASA, and the United States Department of Defense. Tomorrow.io satellites are also used by the governments of Nigeria and the Philippines to provide weather prediction models to farmers.

Founded in 2016, Tomorrow.io began by using IoT and cellular network signals as novel weather data sources before expanding into commercial weather satellites. In February 2026, the company raised $175 million at a valuation exceeding $1 billion, achieving unicorn status. At the same time, the company announced the DeepSky programme, a next-generation AI-native satellite constellation.

== History ==
=== Founding and early development (2016–2020) ===
Tomorrow.io was founded in 2016 as ClimaCell by Shimon Elkabetz, Itai Zlotnik, and Rei Goffer. The company's initial approach to weather forecasting used wireless communication infrastructure and Internet of Things devices to collect real-time weather data at higher resolution and closer to ground level than traditional Doppler weather radar or satellite methods.

In 2019, ClimaCell launched a consumer mobile weather app providing street-by-street, minute-by-minute forecasts. The app was later rebranded as Weather by Tomorrow following the company's 2021 name change.

=== Rebrand and Series D (2021) ===
In February 2021, the company announced Operation Tomorrow Space, a programme to develop and launch proprietary radar-equipped satellites to improve its forecasting capabilities. In March 2021, ClimaCell rebranded as Tomorrow.io and simultaneously announced a $77 million Series D funding round led by Stonecourt Capital and Highline Capital, bringing total funding at that time to approximately $184 million. The company stated the funding would be used to accelerate its SaaS growth and invest in its space programme.

=== SPAC merger and termination (2021–2022) ===
In December 2021, Tomorrow.io announced a planned merger with Pine Technology Acquisition Corp., a special-purpose acquisition company (SPAC), at a post-deal valuation of approximately $1.2 billion. The transaction was expected to provide up to $420 million in gross proceeds.

In March 2022, the two companies mutually agreed to terminate the merger agreement, citing market conditions. Under the terms of the termination, Tomorrow.io paid Pine Technology $1.5 million, and the company remained privately held.

=== Series E and satellite launches (2023) ===
In June 2023, concurrent with the launch of its second satellite, Tomorrow.io raised $87 million in a Series E round led by Activate Capital, with participation from RTX Ventures, Seraphim Space, and Chemonics. Existing investors SquarePeg Capital, Canaan, ClearVision, JetBlue Ventures, and Pitango also participated. The funding was earmarked to complete a constellation of more than 20 satellites.

=== DeepSky and unicorn status (2026) ===
In February 2026, Tomorrow.io announced a $175 million equity financing round led by Stonecourt Capital and HarbourVest Partners, valuing the company at over $1 billion. With this round, total funding reached approximately $508 million. The company reported annual recurring revenue of approximately $100 million at the time of the announcement. The funding was raised to accelerate the deployment of DeepSky, described as the world's first AI-native weather satellite constellation, building on the completed first-generation constellation.

== Technology and products ==
=== Weather intelligence platform ===
Tomorrow.io's core product is an enterprise weather intelligence platform providing real-time, historical, and predictive weather data through a web dashboard, API, and automated alerts.

=== NVIDIA partnership ===
In March 2025, Tomorrow.io announced a technical collaboration with NVIDIA centred on the NVIDIA Earth-2 platform, a cloud-based system for AI-accelerated weather and climate modelling. Under the partnership, Tomorrow.io contributes near-real-time proprietary satellite data to help construct an NVIDIA digital twin of Earth, used for the training, inference, and reinforcement of next-generation atmospheric AI models.

=== Consumer app ===
In 2019, the company released a consumer mobile weather application, initially named ClimaCell Weather, providing minute-by-minute, street-level forecasts.

=== Satellite constellation ===
==== First constellation (2023–2024) ====
The first satellite, Tomorrow-R1, launched on 15 April 2023 aboard a SpaceX Falcon 9 rocket as part of the Transporter-7 rideshare mission from Vandenberg Space Force Base. The satellite carries a Ka-band software-defined radar operating at 35.75 GHz, observing over a 400 km field of view to detect precipitation and ocean surface characteristics.

The second radar satellite, Tomorrow-R2, launched on 12 June 2023 on the SpaceX Transporter-8 mission. At 85 kg, both R-1 and R-2 are microsatellites hosting identical Ka-band radar payloads. Prior to these launches, the only precipitation radar-equipped satellite in orbit was NASA's Global Precipitation Measurement satellite; R-1 and R-2 were the first commercially built weather radar satellites.

In August 2024, Tomorrow.io expanded into passive sensing with the launch of Tomorrow-S1 and Tomorrow-S2, two 6U CubeSats equipped with passive microwave sounder radiometers, aboard SpaceX's Transporter-11 mission. By February 2026, the company reported having completed the full deployment of its first satellite constellation, comprising 13 satellites in low Earth orbit and achieving a 60-minute global revisit rate.

==== Defence contracts ====
Tomorrow.io has secured approximately $20 million in contracts from the United States Department of Defense to support space-based weather sensor development. In May 2024, the company received a contract through the Accelerate the Procurement and Fielding of Innovative Technologies (APFIT) programme to manufacture and deliver two microwave sounder satellites to the United States Air Force Weather Systems Branch by May 2025.

==== DeepSky ====
In February 2026, Tomorrow.io announced DeepSky, a next-generation satellite constellation described as an AI-native weather satellite programme. DeepSky is intended to expand global data coverage, increase sensing frequency, and integrate AI-driven atmospheric intelligence to serve governments, industries, and communities with higher-resolution forecasting than the first constellation.

== Partners and customers ==
Tomorrow.io's platform is used across aviation, logistics, energy, insurance, agriculture, sports, and government sectors. Notable clients include JetBlue Airways, Delta Air Lines, Uber, Ford Motor Company, Fox Sports, and the New England Patriots. Government clients include the United States Department of Defense, the United States Air Force, and municipal governments including the City of Hoboken, New Jersey. The company has also partnered with the governments of Nigeria and the Philippines to improve data on viable planting seasons for crops.

== Recognition ==
In 2024, Tomorrow.io was named to TIME's TIME100 Most Influential Companies list.

In 2024, Fast Company ranked Tomorrow.io the number one Most Innovative Logistics Company in its annual World's Most Innovative Companies list.

In 2025 and 2026, Fast Company ranked Tomorrow.io as the most innovative space company of the year.
