= Glenn Dimmick =

American engineer

Glenn Leslie Dimmick (1905 – April 6, 1999) was an engineer responsible for many seminal contributions in sound motion picture recording.

He worked primarily at RCA, where he developed solutions in the areas of focus infrared technology, monochrome and color television, telephony, and high-vacuum evaporation.

He was a fellow of the Society of Motion Picture and Television Engineers, and his awards included the New Jersey Inventors Hall of Fame award in 1995; AMPTE Progress Medal Award in 1941; the RCA Victor Award of Merit in 1949; the Award of Merit for outstanding achievement presented by the Academy of Motion Picture Arts and Sciences, in 1952; and the Missouri Honor Award for Distinguished Service in Engineering in 1954.

== Education ==
Dimmick received a B.S.E.E. degree from the University of Missouri, Columbia, in 1928.
