= Cecil I. and Mildred H. Dimick House =

Historic house in Utah, United States

- U.S. National Register of Historic Places
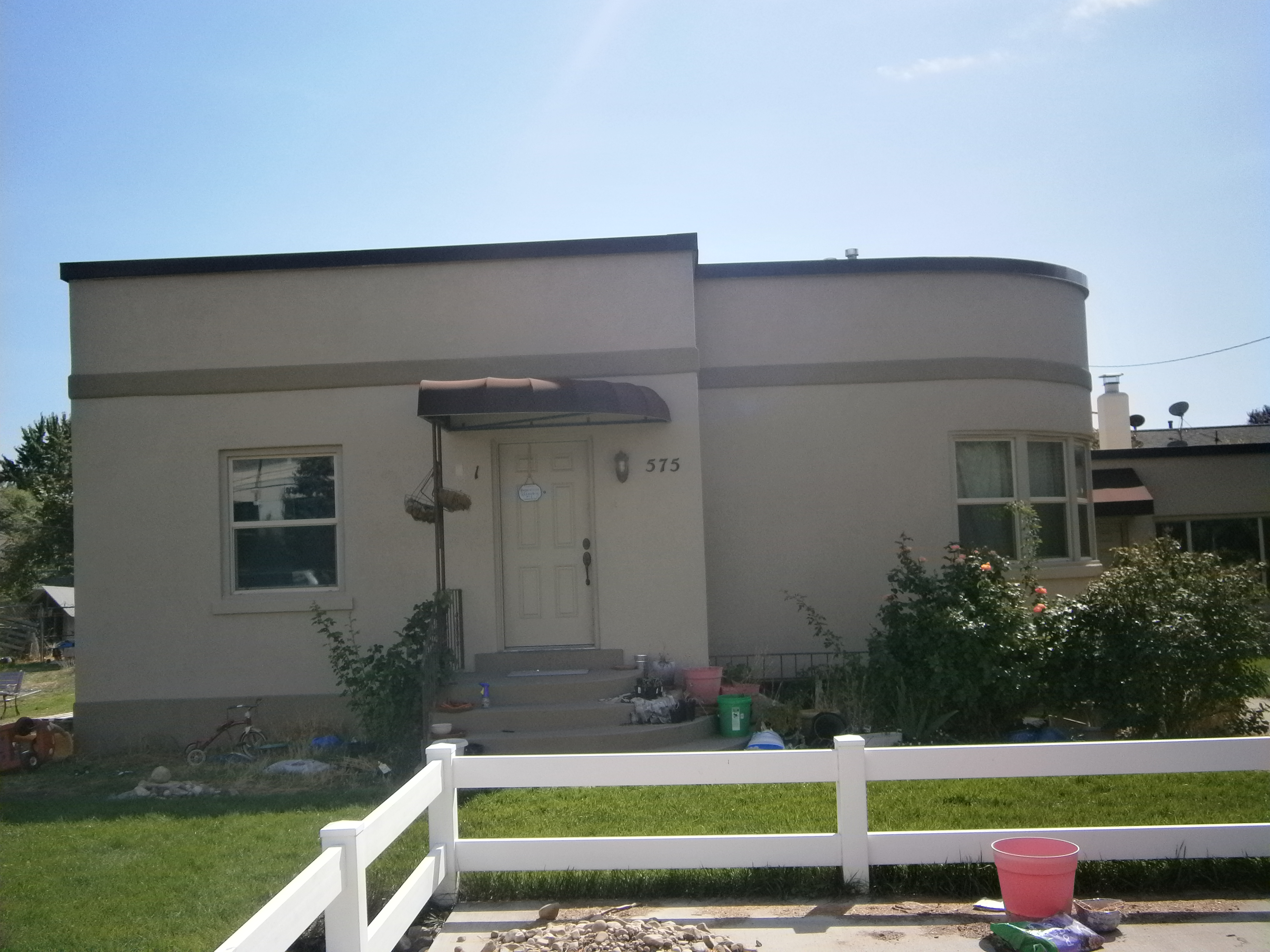

- Location within Utah Location within the United States
- Location: 575 West 800 North, Orem, Utah
- Coordinates: 40°18′43″N 111°42′33″W
- Area: 0.3 acres (0.12 ha)
- Built: 1946
- Architectural style: Moderne
- MPS: Orem, Utah MPS
- NRHP reference No.: 98000638
- Added to NRHP: June 11, 1998

The Cecil I. and Mildred H. Dimick House at 575 West 800 North in Orem, Utah was built in 1946. It was listed on the National Register of Historic Places in 1998.

It is a "rare example" of Art Moderne style design in Orem and in Utah more widely, built in an agrarian and war-time economy.
