= Gideon Goldstein =

American medical doctor

Gideon Goldstein is an American medical doctor, biochemist and molecular biologist. He led the research team that first reported the discovery of ubiquitin, a regulatory protein found in most tissues of eukaryotic organisms in 1975 while at the New York University School of Medicine. He is currently at Thymon LLC, a pharmaceutical company he founded.
