= Crestron Electronics =

American multinational corporation

- Company type: Private
- Industry: Audiovisual automation, control integration
- Founded: 1972
- Founder: George Feldstein
- Headquarters: Rockleigh, New Jersey, United States
- Area served: Worldwide
- Key people: Dan Feldstein (CEO & President) (COO) John Clancy (CSO)
- Products: Home automation, commercial audiovisual
- Revenue: ▲US$2 billion (2020)
- Number of employees: 5000+ (March 2021)
- Website: crestron.com

Crestron Electronics (or simply Crestron) is an American privately held multinational corporation that manufactures and distributes control automation and integration technology. The company designs, manufactures, and distributes equipment used to control technology in commercial audiovisual environments such as meeting spaces, conference rooms, classrooms and auditoriums. Crestron equipment is also used for high-end residential audiovisual installations, built on the company's Crestron Home OS.

== History ==
Crestron was founded by George Feldstein in 1972. After graduating from New York University with a master's in electronic engineering, Feldstein worked as chief engineer at a firm that built industrial control and testing equipment. He left in 1969 to start his own business. He began by cold-calling other businesses, offering to build or repair their equipment. His company's first job was for Colgate-Palmolive, building a device to help automated assembly lines put the right amount of powder into boxes of detergent. An early milestone was the company's development of a wireless remote for commercial audiovisual systems, which led to work developing audio switches, video projectors, and lighting control panels, and selling integrated audiovisual systems to businesses and universities.

After George Feldstein's death in 2014, Randy Klein was named Crestron's CEO and president. In December 2021, Klein retired, and Dan Feldstein took over as CEO and president. In May 2022, Crestron unveiled the company's engineering base, the George Feldstein Technology Center in Rockleigh.

Crestron Certification began in 1998, which evolved into the Crestron Masters program in 2001. Crestron Masters is an annual certification and training event where programmers, technology architects, and systems designers are trained in the latest Crestron technology, industry best practices, and distribution strategies, with various levels of certification offered.

Originally headquartered in Cresskill, New Jersey, Crestron is now headquartered in Rockleigh, New Jersey, with over 90 offices worldwide.

== Products ==
The company does not sell its products directly, instead using a network of dealers and integrators to sell products to end users. Crestron equipment can be found in homes, offices, universities, government buildings, churches, and healthcare facilities worldwide.

The company offers commercial business solutions for enterprise, education, and government, including conference room technology, video distribution, XiO cloud management software, and network security. One such offering is Crestron Flex, a line that integrates video conferencing, wireless presentation, and smart room control. Crestron has been noted for envisioning "the workplace of the future," helping to design workspaces for companies including Meta, Microsoft, and Johnson & Johnson.

The company also offers technology solutions for residential, hospitality, marine, and multi-dwelling units industries using their own operating system, Crestron Home OS. Crestron Home is used to configure and control home automation devices. It integrates with Amazon Alexa, Siri, and Google Home. Crestron Home OS can be customized for each homeowner, based on user preferences.

Mark Zuckerberg's smart home technology, Jarvis, is built on top of smart home technology by Crestron. It uses Crestron to provide a way for Jarvis's app to speak to lights, thermostats, and doors.

Starting in 2016, Crestron donated audiovisual and automation technology to Orbis International's Flying Eye Hospital, an eye care hospital located onboard an aircraft that flies to underserved areas to treat patients at risk of losing their sight. The Crestron technology helps enable staff to operate on these patients and gives local doctors the opportunity to be trained in a classroom onboard the plane. It is the world's first such hospital.

Crestron Electronics hosted its Modern Work Summit on latest workplace trends at the Madrid Marriott Auditorium Hotel and Conference Center in Spain on May 23 and 24, 2023, and featured presentations from Microsoft, Zoom and Gensler.

== Acquisitions ==
Crestron announced partnerships with Huddly in 2017 and with Shure and Jabra in 2021. In 2022, Crestron acquired 1 Beyond, a video technology company.
