= Dimmick Township, LaSalle County, Illinois =

Coordinates: 41°24′22″N 89°06′32″W

Dimmick Township
- Township
- Location in LaSalle County

- LaSalle County's location in Illinois
- Country: United States
- State: Illinois
- County: LaSalle
- Established: November 6, 1849

Area
  - Total: 36.54 sq mi (94.6 km^{2})
  - Land: 36.54 sq mi (94.6 km^{2})
  - Water: 0 sq mi (0 km^{2}) 0%

Population (2020)
  - Total: 755
  - Density: 20.7/sq mi (7.98/km^{2})
- Time zone: UTC-6 (CST)
  - Summer (DST): UTC-5 (CDT)
- FIPS code: 17-099-19980

Dimmick Township is located in LaSalle County, Illinois, USA. As of the 2020 census, its population was 755 and it contained 324 housing units.

== History ==
Dimmick Township was named for an early settler.

== Geography ==
According to the 2021 census gazetteer files, Dimmick Township has a total area of 36.54 square miles (94.64 km^{2}), all land.

== Demographics ==
As of the 2020 census there were 755 people, 246 households, and 167 families residing in the township. The population density was 20.66 inhabitants per square mile (7.98/km^{2}). There were 324 housing units at an average density of 8.87 per square mile (3.42/km^{2}). The racial makeup of the township was 89.14% White, 1.06% African American, 0.26% Native American, 2.52% Asian, 0.00% Pacific Islander, 1.59% from other races, and 5.43% from two or more races. Hispanic or Latino of any race were 6.75% of the population.

There were 246 households, out of which 19.50% had children under the age of 18 living with them, 62.60% were married couples living together, 2.03% had a female householder with no spouse present, and 32.11% were non-families. 29.70% of all households were made up of individuals, and 9.30% had someone living alone who was 65 years of age or older. The average household size was 2.13 and the average family size was 2.64.

The township's age distribution consisted of 16.6% under the age of 18, 4.6% from 18 to 24, 13.7% from 25 to 44, 40.5% from 45 to 64, and 24.6% who were 65 years of age or older. The median age was 54.8 years. For every 100 females, there were 113.9 males. For every 100 females age 18 and over, there were 112.1 males.

The median income for a household in the township was $93,500, and the median income for a family was $113,750. Males had a median income of $62,813 versus $35,625 for females. The per capita income for the township was $53,829. About 1.8% of families and 4.2% of the population were below the poverty line, including 3.4% of those under age 18 and 7.0% of those age 65 or over.

Historical population
Census	Pop.	Note	%±
2010	737		—
2020	755		2.4%
U.S. Decennial Census
