= General Magnaplate =

Magnaplate
- Type: Private
- Industry: Aerospace, Chemical processing, Electronics & Semiconductors, Food, Manufacturing, Medical & Pharmaceutical, Oil & Gas, Packaging, Plastics & Rubber Molds, Powder Bulk Solids, Printing, Space
- Founded: 1952
- Founder: Dr. Charles P. Covino
- Headquarters: Arlington, Texas, United States
- Area served: United States, Canada, Australia, Japan, India, Netherlands, Poland, South Korean, Spain, Sweden, United Kingdom
- Products: Surface treatments for metal parts including anodizing, nickel plating, thermal spray coatings, polymer coatings, titanium nitride coatings and thin dense chrome coatings.
- Services: Nedox, Tufram, Plasmadize
- Website: http://www.magnaplate.com

Magnaplate is a company that offers surface enhancement coatings for metal parts and other substrates to increase hardness, reduce corrosion, increase chemical resistance and reduce surface friction.

== Timeline ==
- 1952 — Magnaplate Metal Finishers is established in Hoboken, New Jersey.
- 1967 — Tufram, Inc. opens in Linden, New Jersey to produce cookware, which is ranked Number 1 in the U.S. two years in a row by Consumer Reports.
- 1968 — Canadize is invented, a coating that augments surface hardness for titanium and titanium alloys.
- 1969 — The first man walks on the Moon, and thanks to General Magnaplate he was able to drill into the Moon's surface. A Canadize treatment on both the inside and outside of the titanium core sample drill tubes prevented samples being contaminated by titanium particles from the drill.
- 1970 — Nedox was invented, a coating that significantly increases metals' corrosion resistance and wear life.
- 1980 — General Magnaplate opens its Ventura, California facility.
- 1982 — General Magnaplate's Texas facility upgrades to its new Arlington location, and Candida Covino joins the company.
- 1985 — Ed Aversenti joins the company
- 1986 — Candida Covino becomes president of General Magnaplate and Magnaplate SNS is invented.
- 1989 — Plasmadize is invented, a coating which combines the advantages of thermal spraying with controlled infusion of dry polymers, dry lubricants or other materials to provide an entirely new composite with improved properties.
- 1995 — Hi-T-Lube is recognized by the Guinness Book of Records as the solid with the lowest coefficient of friction in the world.
- 2002 — General Magnaplate celebrates its 50th anniversary
- 2002 — General Magnaplate obtains ISO 9001 certification
- 2004 — General Magnaplate plays a critical role in the Mars rover landing by providing coatings for the landing mechanism.
- 2007 — Founder Dr. Charles P. Covino dies.
- 2020 - Ashley Russo appointed Chief Operating Officer
- 2024 - Ashley Russo appointed Chief Executive Officer
