= Dorin Cioabă =

Romanian Pentecostal Minister and self-styled "King of Roma Everywhere"

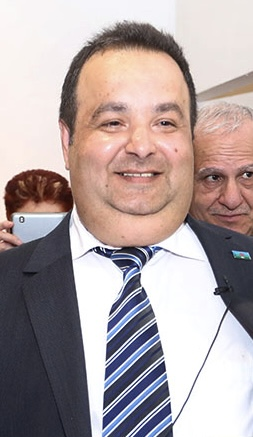

King of the Roma Everywhere (self-proclaimed)
- Incumbent
- Assumed office August 18, 2013
- Preceded by: Florin Cioabă

President of the International Romani Union
- In office 2013–2016
- Preceded by: Florin Cioabǎ
- Succeeded by: Zoran Dimov

Personal details
- Born: 26 November 1969 (age 56) Sibiu, Romania
- Spouse: Sighişoara Cioabă
- Occupation: Pentecostal minister, businessman, mediator

Dorin Cioabă (born 26 November 1969) is a Romanian Roma Pentecostal minister, and businessman who has claimed the title "King of Roma Everywhere" since 2013. He inherited the position from his father, Florin Cioabă. The title is only recognized by a portion of the Romani population, and is disputed by other Romani organizations and leaders.

== Early life and family ==
Cioabă was born on 26 November 1969, in Sibiu, the elder son of Florin Cioabă and Marița Cioabă, part of the Kalderash Romas. His grandfather, Ion Cioabă, had proclaimed himself the first "King of Roma Everywhere" in Romania before dying in February 1997, after which the title passed to Florin. Cioabă is said to have attended a distant vocational high school in Mediaș and later graduated from a Bible institute in Caransebeș. He studied law and political science, and later pursued a master's degree in law. Following Roma tradition, he was himself married at a young age, to Sighişoara Cioabă, with whom he has a child who attended an art high school in Sibiu.

=== Early career ===
Before succeeding his father, Cioabă worked as a mediator, businessman and community leader in Sibiu. He served as president of the Roma Tribunal, an informal customary court operating in the city, and as president of INDIROM, an organization representing nomadic and Kalderash Roma. Cioabǎ also hosted a radio program on Radio Vocea Evangheliei. He ran unsuccessfully for the presidency of the Sibiu County Council in local elections and had stated an intention to seek a seat in the European Parliament under the Greater Romania Party in 2014.

== Succession as king and pastor ==
Cioabă's father, Florin Cioabă, died on 18 August 2013, at a hospital in Antalya, Turkey. Thousands of mourners attended his funeral procession in Sibiu, where coins were thrown into the streets as the coffin passed. Before the burial, a council of family elders proclaimed Dorin Cioabă as international King of Roma, while his younger brother, Daniel Cioabă, was proclaimed King of Romanian Roma. In October 2013, Dorin Cioabă was invested as pastor of the Roma Pentecostal Church in Sibiu, taking over the role his father had held. That same year, he was elected president of the International Romani Union, after which he described himself as "King of Gypsies All Over the World".

== Advocacy and public activities ==
Cioabă has publicly advocated against child marriage within Roma communities, a practice he himself experienced as a young man and that had drawn international criticism after his father arranged the marriage of a 12-year-old daughter in 2003. In 2014 he announced that the Stabor, the community's council of elders, had agreed that Roma should not marry before the age of 16 and that children should attend school before marrying. He has worked to raise awareness of the Roma killed during the Holocaust and held talks with German officials regarding compensation for genocide victims deported to Transnistria.

Ciobǎ has sought greater international recognition for the Roma, including outreach to the United Nations, and has taken part in Holocaust remembrance events, including a 2015 visit to Israel tied to a photography exhibition on Roma history. In a 2015 interview with Channel 4 News in the United Kingdom, he said Roma involved in crime in Britain should be deported, while those working or claiming benefits legally should be supported by the British government. He has met with Romanian officials at his residence in Sibiu.

In February 2024, Romanian tax authorities carried out forced debt collection against Cioabă over unpaid obligations. On 14 March 2025, he underwent emergency surgery at the Sibiu Military Hospital due to a severe intestinal infection, later publicly thanking the medical staff. Later that year, in August 2025, he urged Roma political and organizational leaders to avoid alliances with extremist parties, warning them against accepting what he described as a "poisoned apple".
