= Whitlow Au =

Bioacoustics Expert

Whitlow W. L. Au (July 31, 1940 – February 12, 2020) was a leading expert in bioacoustics specializing in biosonar of odontocetes (dolphins, porpoises, and toothed whales). He is author of the widely known book The Sonar of Dolphins (1993) and, with Mardi Hastings, Principles of Marine Bioacoustics (2008). Au was honored as a Fellow of the Acoustical Society of America in 1990 and awarded the ASA's first Silver Medal in Animal Bioacoustics in 1998. He was graduate advisor to MacArthur Fellow Kelly Benoit-Bird, who credits Au for discovering how sophisticated dolphin sonar is, developing dolphin-inspired machine sonars to separate different species of fish with the goal of protecting sensitive species, and for making numerous contributions to the description of Humpback whale song, which helped protect these whales from ship noise and ship traffic.

He acted as the Chief Scientist of the Marine Mammal Research Program of the Hawaii Institute of Marine Biology at the University of Hawaiʻi until his death in February 2020.

== Background ==
Whitlow Au was born in Honolulu. He received his early education at St. Louis High School from the Catholic Brothers and went on to graduate from the University of Hawaiʻi with his B.S. in electrical engineering in 1962. Following that graduation he left the Islands to study electrical engineering in the doctoral program at Washington State University on the drier side of the state of Washington in Pullman, completing his M.S. in electrical engineering in 1964 and his Ph.D. in Electrical Science in 1970. While a student he became a member of both Sigma Tau and Sigma Xi honor societies. Au joined the United States Air Force space program and was the project officer on a research program studying the propagation of radar signals through the plasma sheath of reentry vehicles at the Air Force Weapons Laboratory in New Mexico. He died on February 12, 2020, after two months of heart problems at age 79.

== Early Navy Work ==
Upon completion of his Air Force service, Whit was recruited and hired as a new professional at the Naval Undersea Center in San Diego, California. Part of the new professional program was to expose newly hired professionals to the various types of programs going on at the San Diego Laboratory and also at its "skunk works" facility on the Marine Corps Air Station Kaneohe Bay in Hawaiʻi. Being Hawaii-raised, Whit took the opportunity to step down out of the ionosphere and to take a quick look toward the ocean at the biosonar or echolocation performance of the Navy's "secret" dolphins. It can't be said for certain how much Whit's fascination for understanding the dolphin's echolocation, or his love of the Islands, influenced his decision, but he decided to join the biosonar research group at the Hawaii Laboratory of the Naval Undersea Center. He then was quickly advanced to the head of its Biosonar Branch.

Au's first paper on the echolocation of dolphins surprised a few people. He, along with physicist Bob Floyd and biologists Earl Murchison and Ralph Penner ["Measurement of echolocation signals of the Atlantic bottlenose dolphin, Tursiops truncatus Montague, in open waters," J. Acoust. Soc Am. 56, 1280-1290 (1974)] found that typical dolphin echolocation signals in the open water had average durations near 40 microseconds with peak energies between 120 and 130 kHz, much higher than the previously reported energy peaks centered at 35 to 60 kHz. That report did much to explain why Scott Johnson had earlier found that bottlenosed dolphins heard sounds up to 150 kHz, but only later did Au report that the previously reported lower peak energy clicks were typical of animals in pools while higher peak energy signals were typically found in the open waters when the animals were looking for small targets a good distance away. That paper also began a precise and methodical examination of the echolocation of dolphins and other small whales carried out by Au that has served to establish, describe, and quantify the echolocation performance and signal characteristics of animals that echolocate under water.

== Biosonar of Dolphins ==
The Journal of the Acoustical Society of America from 1974 to the present day contains dozens of articles with Au's name in the authorship line, a remarkably productive development of the fundamental knowledge of dolphin and whale biosonar. Based on this work and his service, Au became a Fellow of the Acoustical Society of America in 1990. His 20-plus years of investigation were summarized and expanded in his book The Sonar of Dolphins. An analysis and appreciation of this work might best be described by quoting some of the reviewers that did the initial book reviews. David Pye wrote that "... Whitlow Au has written a splendid book, which is likely to become a classic in its field, and of considerable interest well outside it." (Nature 366, 376 (1993)) while Bertel Møhl wrote that "This book is an authoritative, precise and comprehensive treatise in 277 pages of what is known about sonar (or echolocation) in dolphins, written by the leading scientist in the field" [Aquatic Mammals 19 (3), 125-126 (1993)]. James Fullard (Science 260, 1672 (1993)) noted that "Au's book is an excellent synthesis of the mountain of work on dolphin sonar..."

This book seemed to come at the peak of Au's productivity. Dolphin and whale echolocation had been systematically studied at the Hawaii Laboratory since 1970 by combining the skills of electrical engineers, psychologists, biologists, physiologists, physicists, mechanical engineers, veterinarians, astute animal trainers, and, to quote the preface to Au's book, "a political scientist." That combination of professional skills allowed the "mountain of work" on dolphin sonar to be completed and very well presented in The Sonar of Dolphins.

== University of Hawaii ==
The name of the Naval Undersea Center's Hawaii Laboratory changed many times and in 1993 the then-named Naval Ocean Systems Center's Hawaii Laboratory was closed by Congress. While the entire group had the opportunity to move to San Diego and join the Space Warfare Systems Center's program, Au had an offer to move over to the University of Hawaii's Hawai'i Institute of Marine Biology on Coconut Island in Kaneohe Bay to join the marine mammal research program. Au did not hesitate; he immediately took the opportunity to become a faculty member and continue echolocation and hearing research with dolphins and small whales in Hawaii. His research effort did not decline; in fact, his productivity, as evidenced in the number and breadth of publications, has accelerated. He has taken on several students and expanded work to include the acoustics of wild spotted and bottlenose dolphins echolocating through sediments in the Bahamas, the acoustics of wild spinner dolphins off of the Eastern Coast of Oahu, and singing humpback whales off of Maui. He was invited to review the biological acoustics laboratories for the Danish National Research Foundation and has been collaborating on the echolocation of harbor porpoises in the Netherlands.

== Work for the Acoustical Society of America ==
His work with the Acoustical Society of America has been extensive: In 1993–94, he made Animal Bioacoustics a separate technical committee within the ASA, and in 1994 he and Mardi Hastings were appointed its first co-chair. In 1997 he was elected chair of that committee. Since the late 1990s he has been the associate editor for Animal Bioacoustics for The Journal of the Acoustical Society of America. He has been on the Executive Council of the ASA, was vice-president of the ASA in 2006, and President in 2009.

== Books ==
=== Author ===
- Whitlow W. L. Au (1993). The Sonar of Dolphins. New York: Springer-Verlag. Provides a variety of findings on signal strength, directionality, discrimination, biology and more.
- Whitlow W.L. Au and Mardi C. Hastings (2008). Principles of Marine Bioacoustics. New York: Springer-Verlag. Covers measurement and generation of underwater sounds, propagation of acoustic signals, signal processing techniques, and advanced devices used in the field, animal recording methods, animal auditory systems and vocalizations, psychological and physiological testing procedures, and echolocation in marine mammals.

=== Editor ===
- Whitlow W. L. Au, Arthur N. Popper, and Richard R. Fay (2000). Hearing by Whales and Dolphins. Covers cetacean ears, impulse sound sources, communication and acoustic behavior, the auditory central nervous system, electrophysiological measures of auditory processing, psychoacoustic studies of dolphin, echolocation in dolphins, and acoustic models of sound production.

== Awards ==
- 1993: Fellow, Acoustical Society of America
- 1998: Silver Medal in Animal Bioacoustics (the first ever awarded), Acoustical Society of America, "for contributions to the fundamental knowledge of the acoustics of dolphin sonar."
- 2016: ASA Gold Medal

== See also ==
- Animal Echolocation
- Acoustical Society of America
- Hawaii Institute of Marine Biology
