= Warren P. Mason =

American electrical engineer

Mason around 1966

Warren Perry Mason (September 28, 1900 – August 23, 1986) was an American electrical engineer and physicist at Bell Labs. A graduate of Columbia University, he had a prolific output, publishing four books and nearly a hundred papers. He was issued over two hundred patents, more than anyone else at Bell Labs. His work included acoustics, filters, crystals and ceramics, materials science, polymer chemistry, ultrasonics, bonding to semiconductors, internal friction, and viscoelasticity.

Mason founded the field of distributed-element circuits. He was the first to experimentally show viscoelasticity in individual molecules. He found experimental evidence of electron-phonon coupling in solids and made measurements that aided the theories of phonon drag and superconductivity. Many of Mason's inventions in electronics are still widely used by modern circuit designers.

== Family and education ==
Mason was born in Colorado Springs, Colorado, on September 28, 1900, to Kate Sagendorph Mason and Edward Luther Mason, a school principal and insurance salesman. Both his mother and father graduated from the University of Michigan around 1890. His father died when he was fifteen. His elder brother, Edward Sagendorph Mason, became a notable economist.

Mason obtained a B.Sc. in electrical engineering from the University of Kansas in 1921. He continued his education part-time after this at Columbia University, obtaining an M.A. in 1924 and a Ph.D. in 1928, both in physics.

Mason married Evelyn Stuart McNally in 1929. Evelyn was a graduate of Rutgers University and worked as a child psychologist in schools. They had a daughter, Penelope E. Mason. Evelyn died in 1953. Mason married his second wife, Edith Ewing Aylsworth, a teacher, in 1956. Mason and Edith were passengers in the 1965 Carmel mid-air collision. Their plane crash-landed near Danbury, Connecticut, where several people died, including the pilot, who re-entered the burning plane in an attempt to rescue a passenger. Edith died in 1985.

== Career ==
Mason joined the Western Electric Company in 1921. In 1925, Bell Telephone Laboratories (Bell Labs) was split off from Western Electric as a separate company. Mason went with Bell Labs and remained there for his entire career. He retired from Bell Labs in 1965 but remained a consultant there for a further two years. After retirement, he held a visiting professor post at Columbia University and was a research associate at Columbia's Henry Krumb School of Mines. Mason retired from Columbia in 1977.

Mason was a founding member of the Acoustical Society of America, attending its first meeting in December 1928. He later became its president in 1956. Mason was amongst the first three fellows elected to the Society of Engineering Science in 1975 together with Ahmed Cemal Eringen and Harold Liebowitz. Mason died 23 August 23, 1986, in Gainesville, Florida.

== Work ==
Mason's work covered a wide range of fields. A large part of his work concerned filtering, not only in the electrical domain, but also in the mechanical and acoustic domains. Other fields of study included piezoelectric crystals and ceramics, ferroelectric crystals, underwater sound transducers, bonding of metals to metals and semiconductors, physics of wear, semiconductor strain gauges, metal fatigue, and internal friction of solids and liquids.

=== Radio-frequency engineering ===
Mason worked on mechanical filters, a key component of frequency-division multiplexing in telephone carrier systems. They can be made with much sharper transition bands than can be achieved with conventional LC filters. Mason invented a new type of mechanical filter, the quartz crystal filter consisting of lattices of crystals, which became the standard form of filtering on these systems. Mason showed that the efficiency and bandwidth of acoustic transducers, such as those used in sonar, could be massively improved through mechanical–electrical analogies and applying electrical network theory, in particular filter theory.

==== Acoustic and electrical filters ====
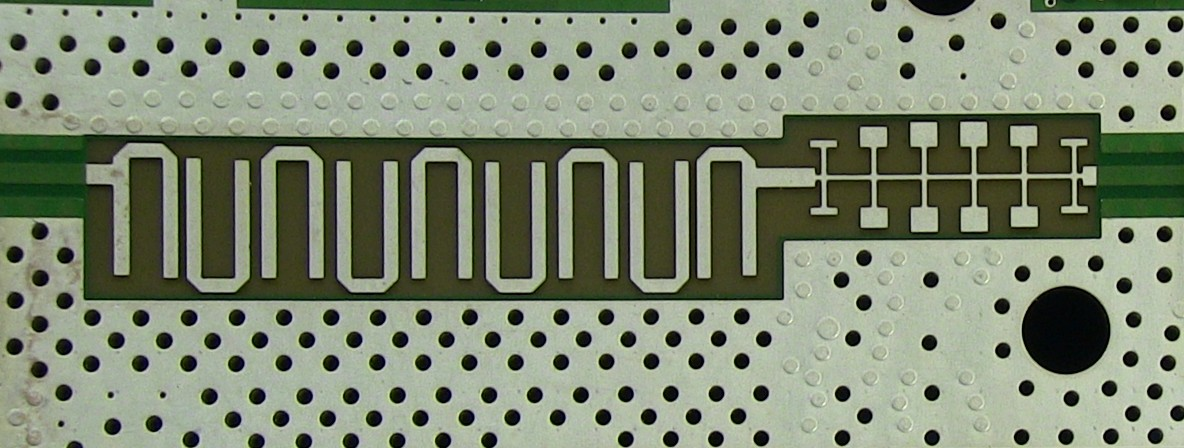
A modern distributed-element circuit. Such circuits are based on the principles established by Mason. This one is a band-pass filter followed by a low-pass filter.

Mason's doctoral thesis was on acoustic filters and horns. In this work, Mason pioneered the use of the distributed-element model to describe acoustic filters. He later extended this work for distributed electrical filters and distributed mechanical filters, making him the founder of the field of distributed-element circuits.

==== Piezoelectric crystals ====
Mason was head of the Crystal Research Department 1935–1948, which studied piezoelectric crystals. He invented the GT crystal cut which has a near zero temperature coefficient of its resonant frequency. The crystal is widely used where accurate frequency is required such as in frequency standards and filtering. Other materials studied were ammonium dihydrogen phosphate, used in sonar transducers, barium titanate, an electrostrictive material, and ethylene diamine tartrate. The latter material was studied as a possible solution to the shortage of Brazilian quartz, since it was water-soluble and hence growable in the laboratory. However, it became unnecessary once quartz crystal growing was possible.

=== Materials and devices ===
During World War II, Mason was tasked with finding a stronger material than neoprene to make sonar domes. The requirement was for a material that retained neoprene's good match to the sonic transmission properties of sea water but had an elastic modulus thousands of times greater. Mason tried mixtures based on cellulose esters whose smell was so bad he was driven out of the lab to a nearby lake to do the testing. This led him to complain that polymer chemistry was not "civilized national defense." Other war work included crystal transducers for sonar and torpedoes, crystal delay lines for radar, and gun silencers.

From 1948, Mason was head of the Mechanics Research Department. Together with Ronald Wick, Mason invented the Mason-Wick horn, a mechanical impedance transformer. This consisted of a solid, exponentially tapered barium titanate rod and was used in experiments to amplify mechanical vibrations. One such type of experiment concerned internal friction and fatigue in metals.

In ultrasonics, Mason provided the first demonstration of single-chain viscoelasticity in which the elasticity is due to the individual molecular chains themselves rather than their entanglement. In 1956 Mason and H. E. Bömmel found experimental evidence for electron-phonon coupling in pure samples of lead and tin. The work was relevant to measurement of parameters in BCS theory of superconductivity.

In 1964 Mason, and T. B. Bateman measured attenuation and velocity changes in doped germanium and silicon. This work helped quantify the theory of phonon drag in semiconductors. Mason used ultrasonics to develop his theory that internal friction in metal alloys and rocks was due to dislocations.

== Characteristics ==
Mason was known for his inventiveness and willingness to ignore conventional wisdom. His name led his colleagues to compare him to the fictional character Perry Mason. Like the fictional lawyer, Mason was said to be able to extract information from sparse data that others would find insufficient to draw conclusions. Mason was known for his peculiar habit of pacing in place while thinking, which he apparently did to avoid missing experimental results as they happened.

== Awards ==
- Charter member, Fellow, president, and Gold Medalist of the Acoustical Society of America.
- Distinguished Alumnus Award of the University of Kansas, 1965.
- Beckman Award of the Instrument Society of America, 1964.
- C. B. Sawyer Memorial Award of the Frequency Control Symposium, 1966.
- IEEE Lamme Medal, 1967.

== Legacy ==
The Journal of the Acoustical Society of America published a special commemorative issue of the journal in 1967 upon Mason's retirement. It contained twenty-seven papers from forty-two international authors. The 117th meeting of the Acoustical Society of America held a session in honor of Mason at which nine invited papers were presented about Mason's life, work, and legacy.

Mason's inventions in electronics are still widely used. These include distributed-element circuits, crystal lattice filters, and the GT quartz crystal.

== Selected works ==
At his retirement in 1965, Mason had 89 papers and 111 patents to his name. By 1973, Mason had accumulated a total of 216 patents. This was the most patents that anyone at Bell Labs had ever been issued. Mason achieved this in an organization where his peers were prolific at producing patents. By 1983, Bell Labs had reached a total of twenty thousand patents.

=== Books ===
- Electromechanical Transducers and Wave Filters, New York: Van Nostrand, 1942 OCLC 213790905
- Piezoelectric Crystals and their Applications to Ultrasonics, New York: Van Nostrand, 1950 OCLC 321010906
- Physical Acoustics and the Properties of Solids, New York: Van Nostrand, 1958 OCLC 878851990
- Crystal Physics of Interaction Processes, New York: Academic Press, 1966 OCLC 1025264945

=== Papers ===
- (with R. A. Sykes) "The use of coaxial and balanced transmission lines in filters and wide band transformers for high radio frequencies", Bell System Technical Journal, vol. 16, pp. 275–302, 1937.
- (with R. F. Wick) "A barium titanate transducer capable of large motion at an ultrasonic frequency", Journal of the Acoustical Society of America, vol. 23, iss. 2, pp. 209–214, 1951.
- (with H. E. Bömmel) "Ultrasonic attenuation at low temperatures for metals in the normal and superconducting states", Journal of the Acoustical Society of America, vol. 28, iss. 5, pp. 930–943, 1956.
- (with T. B. Bateman) "Ultrasonic-wave propagation in pure silicon and germanium", Journal of the Acoustical Society of America, vol. 36, iss. 4, pp. 644–652, 1964.
- (with John T. Kuo) "Internal friction of Pennsylvania slate", Journal of Geophysical Research, vol. 76, iss. 8, pp. 2084–2089, 10 March 1971.
- "Internal friction in Moon and Earth rocks", Nature, vol. 243, pp. 461–463, 24 December 1971.
- "Internal friction, acoustic emission and fatigue in metals for high amplitude ultrasonic frequencies", Engineering Fracture Mechanics, vol. 8, iss. 1, pp. 89–96, 1976.

== Bibliography ==
- Bernstein, Jeremy, Three Degrees Above Zero: Bell Laboratories in the Information Age, Cambridge University Press, 1987 ISBN 0521329833.
- Fagen, M. D.; Millman, S., A History of Engineering and Science in the Bell System: Volume 5: Communications Sciences (1925–1980), AT&T Bell Laboratories, 1984 ISBN 0932764061.
- Hunter, Ian, Theory and Design of Microwave Filters, IET, 2001 ISBN 0852967772.
- Mason, Warren P., "A study of the regular combination of acoustic elements, with applications to recurrent acoustic filters, tapered acoustic filters, and horns", Bell System Technical Journal, vol. 6, no. 2, pp. 258–294, April 1927.
- Mason, Warren P., "The propagation characteristics of sound tubes and acoustic filters", Physical Review, vol. 31, no. 2, pp. 283–295, February 1928.
- Mason, Warren P., "Electrical and mechanical analogies", Bell System Technical Journal, vol. 20, no. 4, pp. 405–414, October 1941.
- Miller, Harry B. (chair), "Warren P. Mason memorial session", Journal of the Acoustical Society of America, vol. 85, iss. S1, pp. S19-S21, May 1989.
- Obituaries, New York Times, p. B12, August 28, 1986.
- Polkinghorn, Frank A., "Oral-History: Warren P. Mason", interview no. 005 for the IEEE History Centre, 3 March 1973, Engineering and Technology History Wiki, retrieved 15 April 2018.
- Rajagopal, K., Textbook of Engineering Physics: Part 1, PHI Learning, 2008 ISBN 8120336658.
- Terman, Frederick Emmons, Radio Engineer's Handbook, McGraw-Hill, 1943 OCLC 504724694
- Thurston, Robert N., "Warren P. Mason: 1900–1986", Journal of the Acoustical Society of America, vol. 81, iss. 2, pp. 570–571, February 1987.
- Thurston, Robert N., "Historical note: Warren P. Mason (1900–1986) physicist, engineer, inventor, author, teacher", IEEE Transactions on Ultrasonics, Ferroelectrics, and Frequency Control, vol. 41, no. 4, pp. 425–434, July 1994.
- Tomasi, Wayne, Electronic Communications Systems, Prentice Hall, 2001 ISBN 0130221252.
- Ward, Reeder N.; Montgomery, Mark T.; Gottlieb, Milton, "Scanners and modulators—acousto-optical", pp. 2488–2524 in, Driggers, Ronald G. (ed), Encyclopedia of Optical Engineering, CRC Press, 2003 ISBN 0824742524.
