= Ruth Gates =

American marine biologist (1962–2018)

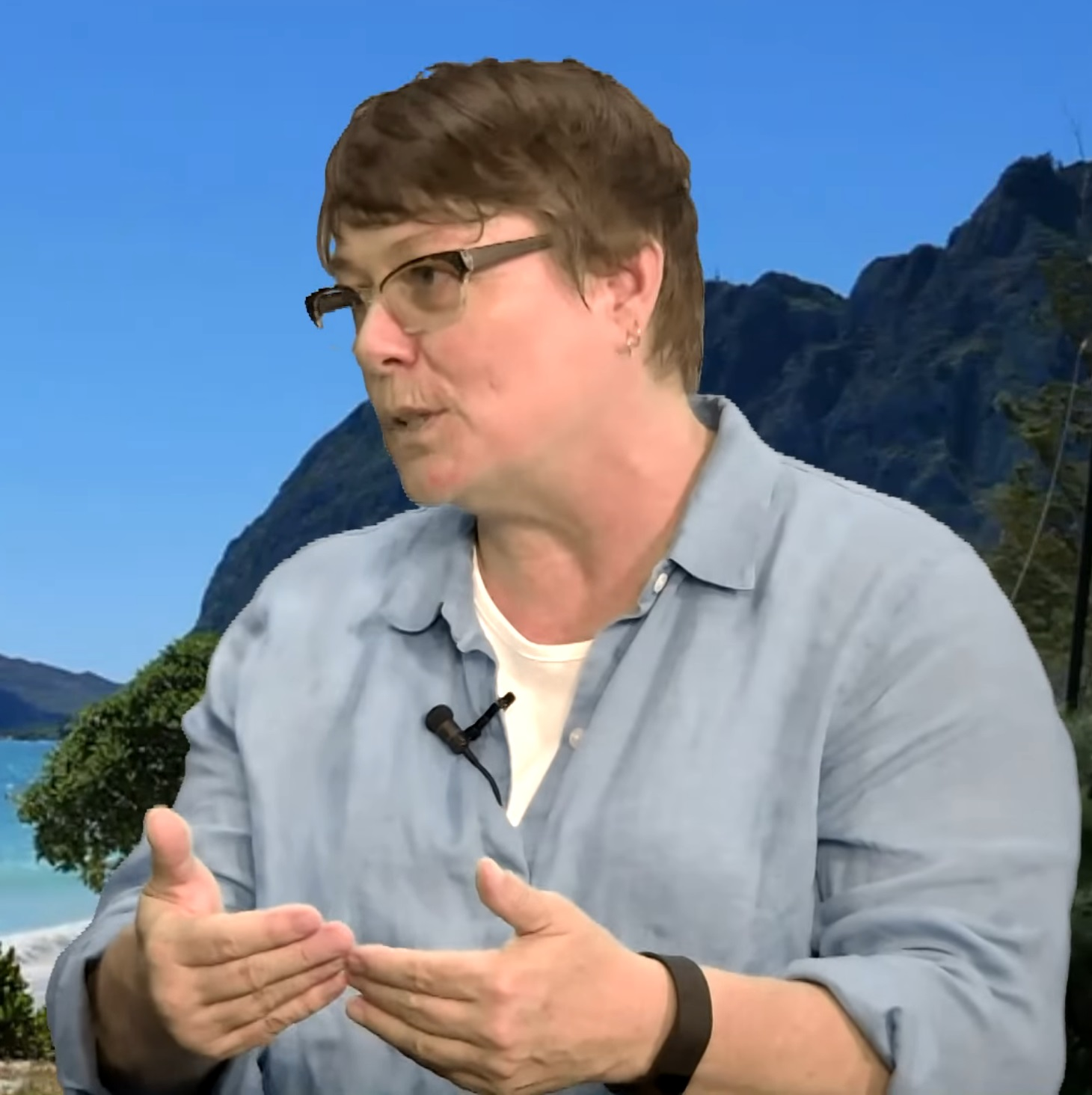
- Ruth Gates discusses coral reef science on ThinkTech Hawaii in 2016
- Born: Ruth Deborah Gates; March 28, 1962; Akrotiri, Cyprus
- Died: October 25, 2018 (aged 56); Kailua, Hawaii, U.S.
- Education: Newcastle University (BSc, PhD)
- Known for: Coral reef research
- Spouse: Robin Burton-Gates
- Scientific career
- Fields: Marine biology
- Workplaces: University of California, Los Angeles; Hawaiʻi Institute of Marine Biology
- Thesis: Seawater temperature and algal-cnidarian symbiosis (1989)
- Website: gatescorallab.com

Ruth Deborah Gates (March 28, 1962 – October 25, 2018) was the Director of the Hawaiʻi Institute of Marine Biology and the first woman to be President of the International Society for Reef Studies. Her research was dedicated to understanding coral reef ecosystems, specifically coral-algal symbiosis and the capacity for corals to acclimatize under future climate change conditions. Doctor Gates is most accredited with looking at coral biology and human-assisted coral evolution, known as super corals, as notably seen in the documentary Chasing Coral, available on Netflix.

== Education ==
Gates was inspired by the documentary The Undersea World of Jacques Cousteau. She studied biology at Newcastle University where she earned a Bachelor of Science degree in 1984. She fell in love with corals during a diving trip to the West Indies. In 1985 she moved to the West Indies to study corals. She completed her PhD at Newcastle University in 1989 on seawater temperature and algal-cnidarian symbiosis. During her postgraduate work in Jamaica, she was exposed to the bleaching response of coral resulting from rising temperatures.

== Career and research ==
After her PhD, Gates was appointed a postdoctoral researcher at the University of California, Los Angeles. Here she spent thirteen years working as a junior researcher in California, developing skills in cellular biology, evolutionary biology, and molecular genetics. She was there during the 1998 bleaching event that killed more than 15% of corals across the world.

Gates joined the Hawaiʻi Institute of Marine Biology in 2003. She studied corals and reefs, learning how they function and working on ways to slow their decline. She worked on Coconut Island, trying to identify why some corals survive bleaching. Her group monitored the ecosystems of coral reefs to understand how a changing environment impacted coral health. The corals in shallow patches like Kāneʻohe Bay are subject to high temperatures and irradiance. Alongside seawater temperature, they measure photosynthetic active radiation, salinity and nutrient composition. This allowed them to build 3D models of reefs. They study the Symbiodinium that live within coral tissues. These provide the corals with energy and are lost during coral bleaching. They develop new techniques for data analysis and management, including developing EarthCube and CRESCYNT. Gates was concerned about sunscreen that contains octinoxate and oxybenzone, and in 2015 called for it to be banned in Hawaii. These sunscreens were banned in 2018. In 2012 she demonstrated that the choice of symbiotic algae was crucial for how tropical reefs survived environmental stresses. She predicted that more than 90 percent of the world's corals will be dead by 2050.

=== Gates Coral Lab ===
Gates established the Gates Coral Lab at the Hawaiʻi Institute of Marine Biology. Even after the death of Ruth Gates in October 2018, her team continues on to conduct research centered around the biological traits of coral reef ecosystems. The team uses their research to inform restoration efforts and management policies. Significant contributions to coral reef research has been contributed by the Gates Coral Lab. The team works in collaboration with the Australian Institute of Marine Science on the Coral Assisted Evolution Project, which attempts to "stabilize and restore coral reefs" in the face of climate change.

Gates' research team hosted the first coral restoration workshop in Hawaii at the Hawaiʻi Institute of Marine Biology in 2017. The research team's restoration efforts in Hawaii's coral reefs focus on realistic and effective approaches. Recent publications have discussed the necessity of focusing on local restoration and recovery efforts as opposed to mass scale restoration until there is more substantial research on how to best combat the root of the problem of bleaching events, climate change. Other research and restoration publications have discussed the effects of beneficial mutations, genetic variation, and human assisted relocation.

=== Super Coral ===
"Super corals" were defined as those that did not bleach during natural bleaching events when sea temperatures were high. Gates identified these so-called "super corals" as a potential mechanism for preventing coral extinction. Gates said, "I just cannot bear the idea that future generations may not experience a coral reef. The mission is to start solving the problem, not just to study it." In 2013, she won the Paul G. Allen Ocean Challenge, a $10,000 prize that allowed her to improve the resilience of vulnerable coral reef ecosystems. For the proposal, Gates joined Madeleine van Oppen, and used genetic selection to boost resilience to environmental stress. They did this by exposing cross-bred corals to successively warmer and more acidic experimental tanks. In the laboratory, they took resistant corals and collected their reproductive products after spawning, raised their offspring in the lab, and tested for increased temperature resistance. Gates was awarded the University of Hawaii Board of Regents Medal for Excellence in Research. Coral Assisted Evolution, a $4 million research project, was funded by the Paul G. Allen Frontiers Group. This supported Gates' research for four years from 2016, developing super corals that can withstand climate change. Whilst Gates was concerned about playing with nature, she could not sit by and watch species become extinct without acting. In 2016, Gates was named by Hawaii Business as one of the top 20 leaders of Hawaii. She explored whether non-super corals could be encouraged to take on new symbionts to improve their ability to withstand high temperatures. If Gates' project is successful, it could save the US$9.9 trillion. In 2018, the foundation supported a coral reef map, that allowed scientists to monitor corals in unprecedented detail.

=== Public engagement ===
In addition to her career in research, Gates served as a mentor, public speaker, science communicator, and proponent for change and progress in the field of marine science. She captivated and inspired audiences with her passion, optimism, and, as she modestly put it, her English boarding school accent. She was elected the first female president of the International Society for Reef Studies in 2015 and significantly increased membership and involvement while she served. The Super Coral proposals were featured in Fast Company, Gizmodo, PBS, Newsweek, Hawaii Business, National Geographic, the Huffington Post, New Scientist and the BBC. Her work was featured in the Netflix documentary Chasing Coral. She was an invited speaker at the 2017 Aspen Ideas Festival. She was featured on the University of Hawaiʻi Foundation video series in 2018. The Gates Coral Lab is involved in a wide range of public engagement and outreach, including hosting students from Mo'orea. She was a member of the Tetiaroa Society.

=== Chasing Coral ===
Gates' work at the Hawaiʻi Institute of Marine Biology is featured in the captivating Netflix documentary, Chasing Coral. In the documentary, she explains her amazement with corals: "I have the utmost respect for corals because I think they have got us all fooled. Simplicity on the outside does not mean simplicity on the inside." The documentary showcases her work with Richard Vevers and the rest of his diving team on a project to capture the process of coral bleaching in the wild for the first time. Gates provides the scientific foundation of knowledge for the conduction of this project, educating the team of divers and the audience of the film throughout. She warns the audience of the "eradication of an entire ecosystem in our lifespan" to encourage progress in the movement against climate change. Her appearance in Chasing Coral was one of Gates' several efforts of public outreach and engagement, working to raise awareness of coral bleaching and inspire the public to put a stop to these events.

== Personal life ==
Gates was born in Akrotiri, Cyprus, the sister of Timothy Gates and the daughter of John Amos Gates (RAF) and Muriel Peel Gates (physiotherapist). Her wife was Robin Burton-Gates, whom she married in September 2018. In her free time, she was an accomplished scuba diver, earned a black belt in karate, and started a school for karate in Hawaii.

Gates was diagnosed with brain cancer at 56 years old, but died from complications during a surgery for diverticulitis, unrelated to her former diagnosis. Gates leaves a legacy of optimism and progress in the field of marine science: Van Oppen, the Gates Coral Lab, and multiple other labs across the globe, continue to study the mechanisms of resistance to climate change and how they may be passed down generations.
