= Judy R. Dubno =

American scientist and audiology researcher

- Born: 1951/1952
- Education: Hunter College; UCLA School of Medicine
- Occupations: American scientist Researcher (audiology)
- Employer: Medical University of South Carolina

Judy R. Dubno (born 1951/1952) is an American scientist and researcher in the field of audiology. She is a distinguished university professor and director of research in the department of otolaryngology at the Medical University of South Carolina in Charleston. She is recognized for her scientific contributions to the understanding of presbycusis, a condition of hearing loss that occurs gradually for many aging adults. She has been involved in the development and implementation of several new methods for assessing hearing loss, including the Hearing in Noise Test (HINT) and Speech Intelligibility Index (SII). She has won numerous awards for her work, including the Jerger Career Award for Research in Audiology in 2011. She served as President of the Acoustical Society of America from 2014 to 2015.

== Early life ==
Dubno received her bachelor's degree from Hunter College in New York City. She earned her Master's and PhD degrees in Speech and Hearing Science from the City University of New York. She completed a post-doctoral fellowship at the UCLA School of Medicine, where she specialized in the study of auditory function in aging adults.

== Career ==
After completing her post-doctoral fellowship, Dubno remained at the UCLA School of Medicine as a faculty member for several years. In 1991 she joined the Medical University of South Carolina in Charleston, South Carolina. As of 2023, she is a distinguished university professor and director of research in the department of otolaryngology at the Medical University of South Carolina in Charleston. Her research has been supported by grants from the National Institutes of Health (NIH) since 1981, and she has co-authored over two hundred articles since 1987.

Among her many accomplishments, Dubno has contributed to the development of the Speech Intelligibility Index (SII), which is a measure of speech clarity that takes into account the audibility of different speech sounds. The SII has been extensively used in the fitting of hearing aids and the design of hearing assistive devices. Dubno has also been involved in the development and validation of the Hearing in Noise Test (HINT), which is a widely used measure of speech perception in noise. HINT uses sentences presented in a background of noise to measure speech recognition abilities in noisy environments.

Dubno has served on four National Academies of Science, Engineering, and Medicine consensus committees, and was the 2014-2015 President of the Acoustical Society of America. She served on NIH review panels, and was a member of the NIH National Institute on Deafness and Other Communication Disorders (NIDCD) Advisory Council. She also served as President of the Association for Research in Otolaryngology.

== Awards ==
In 2011 Dubno was awarded the Jerger Career Award for Research in Audiology. In 2012, she was the inaugural recipient of the MUSC Peggy Schachte Research Mentor Award. In 2018, she was awarded the South Carolina Governor's Award for Excellence in Science, which honors an individual or team from South Carolina whose achievements in science deserve wider recognition.

She has also received the Honors of the American Speech-Language-Hearing Association, the Life Achievement Award from the American Auditory Society, the South Carolina Governor's Award for Excellence in Science, and the Gold Medal from the Acoustical Society of America.

== Publications ==
According to PubMed Central, Dubno has co-authored over two hundred articles since 1987, beginning with "Auditory brain stem evoked response characteristics in the full-term newborn infant." The SII application is described in the article, "Clinical Implications of Word Recognition Differences in Earphone and Aided Conditions.

Recent research on HINT includes her co-authored 2023 article "Longitudinal Speech Recognition Changes After Cochlear Implant: Systematic Review and Meta-analysis. She continues to bring awareness and advance research in the field of presbyacusis, including the 2021 article, "Translational and interdisciplinary insights into presbyacusis: A multidimensional disease."
