= William Hartmann =

William Hartman or William Hartmann may refer to:

== Hartman ==
- William Coleman Hartman Jr. (1915–2006), American football player
- William G. Hartman (born 1938), West Virginia politician
- William J. Hartman, U.S. Army general and acting director of the National Security Agency
- Billy Hartman (born 1957), Scottish actor
- Meteos (gamer) (William Hartman), American professional League of Legends player

== Hartmann ==
- William Kenneth Hartmann, planetary scientist and author at the Planetary Science Institute
- William M. Hartmann (born 1939), physicist, psychoacoustician at Michigan State University
