= Robert T. Beyer =

American physicist (1920–2008)

- Born: Robert Thomas Beyer; January 27, 1920; Harrisburg, Pennsylvania, U.S.
- Died: August 20, 2008 (aged 88)
- Education: Hofstra College (AB); Cornell University
- Occupation: Physicist
- Spouse: Ellen Fletcher (m. 1944; died 2005)
- Children: 4
- Awards: ASA Gold Medal (1984)

Robert Thomas Beyer (January 27, 1920 – August 20, 2008) was an American physicist, best known for his work in acoustics, and for his translations of Russian and German physics books and journals into English.

== Early life and education ==
Beyer was born in Harrisburg, Pennsylvania, on January 27, 1920. He received his A.B. in Mathematics from Hofstra in 1942, and his doctorate in physics from Cornell University in 1945, with a dissertation focused on magnetic amplifiers.

== Career ==
Beyer was hired as an instructor at Brown University in 1945, where Robert Bruce Lindsay quickly persuaded him to join the physical acoustics laboratory. He spent his entire career at Brown, being appointed assistant professor in 1947, associate professor in 1951, and full professor in 1958, serving as chairman of the physics department from 1968-74.

He co-wrote the book "College Physics" in 1957, followed by the advanced treatises "Physical Ultrasonics" and "Nonlinear Acoustics" in 1969 and 1976, respectively. In 2000, his book "Sounds of Our Times", a history of the science of acoustics since 1800, was published by Springer Science+Business Media.

== Translations ==
Beyer translated John von Neumann's Mathematical Foundations of Quantum Mechanics from German into English, in 1955, for Princeton University Press.

== Personal life ==
Beyer was afflicted with severe rheumatic fever as a teenager, which damaged his heart, and later by multiple sclerosis.

He married the former Ellen Fletcher on Valentine's Day in 1944, and they remained devoted to each other until Ellen's death in 2005. They had four children: Catherine Beyer Hurst, Margaret Beyer, Rick Beyer, and Mary Beyer Trotter.

He died in August 2008.
