= Ivan Tolstoy (scientist) =

American geophysicist

Ivan Tolstoy (March 30, 1923– February 18, 2023) was an American geophysicist and popular science writer. His research interests included seafloor geology and topography, seismology, ocean and atmospheric acoustics and seismic wave propagation.

== Biography ==
Ivan Tolstoy was born in Baden-Baden, Germany, to a Russian noble family of Andre Tolstoy and Maria Shuvalova who emigrated from Russia due to the October Revolution. He studied at Sorbonne University, Paris, graduating in geology in 1945. In 1946 he moved to the United States (naturalized in 1948) and enrolled at Columbia University for graduate studies (MA in 1948 and Ph.D. in 1951). After receiving the Ph.D. degree he became research scientist at Columbia, later professor of geophysics at Florida State University and later vising professor at Leeds University.

He is credited for the discovery of T phases in underwater seismology (1950) and for the mapping of the Mid-Atlantic Ridge. He is the namesake of the Biot–Tolstoy–Medwin diffraction model used in acoustics.

== Books ==
=== Science ===
- Ocean Acoustics (with Clarence S. Clay Jr.), McGraw Hill, NY, 1967. also Russian transl., Akoustika Okeana Ed.Mir, Moscow, 1969
  - Russian translation: Акустика океана: теория и эксперимент в подводной акустикеАкустика океана: теория и эксперимент в подводной акустике, 1969
  - Ocean Acoustics, 2nd enlarged ed. Am. Inst. Phys., 1987
- Wave Propagation, McGraw Hill, NY, 1973

=== Popular science ===
- The Pulse of a Planet, New Am. Library, Signet, 1971
- James Clerk Maxwell, a biography, Canongate, 1981, U.Chicago Press, 1982
- The Knowledge and the Power, reflections on the history of science, Canongate, 1990

=== Other ===
- Lands of Exile (autobiography), Kindle, 2012

== Honors ==
- 1958: Fellow of the Acoustical Society of America (ASA)
- 1990: Recipient of the ASA Pioneers of Underwater Acoustics Medal.
- AAAS (American Association for the Advancement of Science) life member

== Personal ==
He had three children, all US born: from the first marriage to Mary Louise Simon: Alexandra (1947); from the second marriage to Margie Lugthart: Eline Tolstoy (1965), Maya Tolstoy (1967). Since 1975 he lived in Knockvennie, Castle Douglas, Scotland. Both marriages ended in divorces and his last companion was Maureen Biggar.
