= Cathy Ann Clark =

American applied mathematician

Cathy Ann Clark is an American applied mathematician known for her work on the computational modeling of undersea acoustics. After working for many years with and in the Naval Undersea Warfare Center in Newport, Rhode Island, she retired to become a mathematics teacher at Queen of the Apostles Preparatory Academy in Middletown, Connecticut.

== Education and career ==
Clark was a mathematics student at Morehead State University in Kentucky, graduating in 1970. From 1969 to 1973 she worked as a communications systems analyst at Western Union Corporation. She received a master's degree in mathematics in 1976 at the University of Connecticut, while working from 1973 to 1979 as a lecturer at the University of Connecticut and at local community colleges.

In 1979 she began working with Sonalysts, Inc., a defense contractor based in Waterford, Connecticut; her work with Sonalysts connected her to both the Naval Undersea Warfare Center on underwater acoustic modeling, and to NASA in work on satellite communications. In 1997 she moved to work directly for the Naval Undersea Warfare Center.

She returned to graduate study at the University of Rhode Island, where she received a second master's degree, in electrical engineering, in 2001, and a Ph.D. in applied mathematics in 2004. Her doctoral dissertation, Global behavior of nonlinear difference equations, was supervised by Mustafa Kulenović. She remained at the Naval Undersea Warfare Center until 2021, and subsequently became a mathematics teacher at Queen of the Apostles Preparatory Academy.

== Recognition ==
Clark was elected as a Fellow of the Acoustical Society of America in 2010, "for contributions to computational undersea propagation".
