= Monita =

Monita may refer to:

- A unisex given name:
  - Monita Chatterjee, Indian-American medical scientist
  - Monita Delamere (1921–1993), New Zealand rugby player
  - Monita Rajpal (born 1974), international journalist
  - Monita Tahalea, Indonesian pop, folk and jazz singer
- A Latin word meaning "instructions":
  - Monita, work by Abbot Porcarius I of Lérins (c. 500)
  - Monita Secreta, an alleged code of instructions of the Jesuits
