= Ira Hirsh =

Ira Hirsh (February 22, 1922 – January 12, 2010) was an American psychologist who made early contributions to the field of audiology. He was the Edward Mallinckrodt Distinguished University Professor of Psychology and Audiology at Washington University in St. Louis (WashU) and served as president of the Acoustical Society of America.

== Biography ==
Born in New York, Hirsh earned an undergraduate degree from the New York State College for Teachers. While earning a master's degree at the Northwestern University School of Communication, he worked for a CBS Radio station in Chicago as a staff announcer and radio drama actor. After serving in the United States Army Air Forces, Hirsh earned a Ph.D. at Harvard University, where he conducted research at the Psycho-Acoustics Laboratory (PAL) under Stanley Smith Stevens. He took a position at the PAL before joining the Central Institute for the Deaf (a school for the deaf that teaches students using listening and spoken language which is affiliated with Washington University School of Medicine).

He remained affiliated with CID until 1983 and from, but he held academic posts at WashU at the same time, including professor of psychology and dean of arts and sciences. Hirsh wrote a well-known audiology textbook, The Measurement of Hearing (1952), and was widely published in professional journals. He made important research observations about the brain's processing of speech over various time intervals. He was president of the Acoustical Society of America (ASA) in 1967–68 and received the ASA Gold Medal in 1992. Hirsh was inducted into the National Academy of Sciences in 1979.

In their spare time, Hirsh and his wife Shirley participated in ice dancing. Hirsh sang in the choir at the First Unitarian Church of St. Louis and was a member of the Saint Louis Chamber Chorus and the Bach Society of St. Louis. Upon his wife's 2004 death, Hirsh had been married for 61 years. He had four children. Hirsh died in 2010 in a convalescent center in Durham, North Carolina.
