= Floyd Dunn =

American electrical engineer (1924–2015)

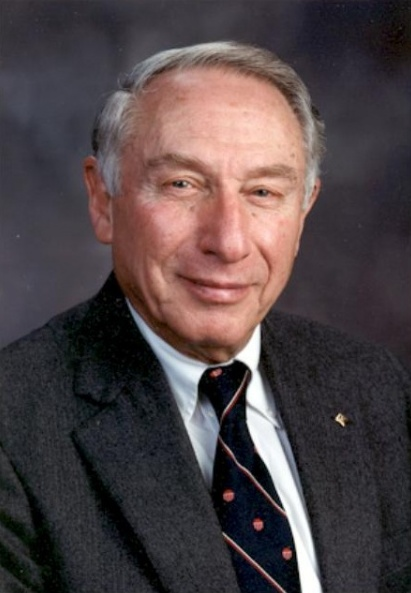
- Dunn wearing an NAE tie.
- Born: April 14, 1924; Kansas City, Missouri
- Died: January 24, 2015 (aged 90); Tucson, Arizona
- Awards: IEEE Edison Medal (1996); ASA Gold Medal (1998)

Floyd Dunn (April 14, 1924 – January 24, 2015) was an American electrical engineer who made contributions to all aspects of the interaction of ultrasound and biological media. Dunn was a member of Scientific Committee 66 of the National Council on Radiation Protection and Measurements as well as many FDA, NIH, AIUM, and ASA committees. He collaborated with scientists in the UK, Japan, China and Post-Soviet states.

== Biography ==
He received the B.S., M.S., and Ph.D. degrees in 1949, 1951, and 1956, respectively, from the University of Illinois, Urbana, all in Electrical Engineering. Dunn joined the faculty of the University of Illinois in 1955, became Professor in 1965, and retired in 1995. He was Director of the Bioacoustics Research laboratory from 1977 to 1995, and Chairman of the Bioengineering Faculty 1978 to 1982.

His death came 30 days after that of his wife, Elsa.

== Awards and honors ==
- Fellow, Institute of Electrical and Electronics Engineers (IEEE)
- Fellow, Acoustical Society of America (ASA)
- Fellow, American Institute of Ultrasound in Medicine (AIUM)
- Fellow, American Association for the Advancement of Science (AAAS)
- Fellow, Institute of Acoustics (IOA)
- Fellow, American Institute for Medical and Biological Engineering (AIMBE)
- Member, United States National Academy of Sciences (NAS)
- Member, National Academy of Engineering (NAE)
- Member, Biophysical Society
- William J. Fry Memorial Award (1984)
- Joseph H. Holmes Basic Science Pioneer Award of the AIUM (1990)
- AIUM/WFUMB History of Medical Ultrasound Pioneer Award (1988)
- University of Illinois Senior Scholar Award
- Medal of Special Merit of the Acoustical Society of Japan (1988)
- Silver Medal in Bioresponse to Vibration of the Acoustical Society of America (1989)
- Career Achievement Award of the IEEE Engineering in Medicine and Biology Society (1995)
- 1996 IEEE Edison Medal For creative contributions to the fundamental knowledge of ultrasonic propagation in and interactions with biological media
- 1997 Distinguished Alumni Award from the Department of Electrical and Computer Engineering at the University of Illinois
- 1998 ASA Gold Medal For creative contributions to fundamental knowledge of ultrasonic propagation in, and interactions with, biological media
- 2008 William and Francis Fry Honorary Fellowship lifetime achievement award by the International Society for Therapeutic Ultrasound
