= Monita Chatterjee =

Auditory scientist

- Scientific career
- Fields: Auditory sciences
- Institutions: Northwestern University
- Thesis: “Aspects of Frequency and Intensity Coding in the Cochlea” (1994)
- Doctoral advisor: Jozef J. Zwislocki and Robert L. Smith

Monita Chatterjee is an auditory scientist and Professor in the Department of Communication Sciences and Disorders at Northwestern University in Evanston, IL. Until 2025, she was a Scientist and Director of the Auditory Prostheses & Perception Laboratory at Boys Town National Research Hospital. She investigates the basic mechanisms underlying auditory processing by cochlear implant listeners.

== Biography ==
Chatterjee did her undergraduate studies in Electrical Engineering at Jadavpur University in Kolkata, India, graduating in 1987. After obtaining her PhD in Neuroscience from Syracuse University in 1994, she spent 10 years, from 1994 to 2004, at the House Ear Institute, first as postdoctoral researcher in the group led by Robert V. Shannon, and then as a scientist. She joined the University of Maryland, College Park, in 2005 as an assistant professor, and was promoted to associate professor in 2009. In 2012, she moved to Omaha, NE, joining the research group at Boys Town National Research Hospital. At Boys Town, Chatterjee lead the APPLab and served as Director of the Technology Core. She was Program Director of the Post-Doctoral Training Grant at Boys Town, funded continuously by NIH for 41 years.

Chatterjee's work has been funded by the National Institutes of Health since 1998. She has served as a member of the Program Committee of the Association for Research in Otolaryngology. In 2017, she was elected Fellow of the Acoustical Society of America "For contributions to cochlear implant psychophysics and speech perception."

Chatterjee was a keynote speaker at the 105th convention of the Audio Engineering Society in 1998. She was also a keynote speaker at the 2017 conference of the American Cochlear Implant Alliance (CI2017). She was elected Scientific Chair of the 2013 Conference on Implantable Auditory Prostheses (CIAP). In 2018 she was an invited Translational Research Speaker at the American Auditory Society's annual meeting and received their Carhart Memorial award/lecture recognition in 2023.She has served as associate editor of Ear & Hearing, American Journal of Audiology,,Frontiers in Aud. Cog. Neurosc. and JASA Express Letters and is currently associate editor of the Journal of the Association for Research in Otolaryngology

In 2021, Chatterjee established a network for Black, Indigenous, and other Persons of Color working in the area of Communication Sciences and Disorders at any career level. The primary objective of this grassroots network is to share resources, mentoring, and collaborative interests between members.

== Research ==
Chatterjee has published extensively on the processing and perception of electrical signals by cochlear implant patients. These include studies of channel-interaction, amplitude modulation processing, modulation masking/modulation detection interference and voice pitch coding, an area of specific deficits in listeners with cochlear implants.

Chatterjee pioneered research on auditory scene analysis in cochlear-implant users. Until this study, the exploration of the auditory stream segregation phenomenon was limited to normal hearing listeners and hearing-impaired listeners.

Chatterjee's recent work turned to auditory, affective, and linguistic development, and has focused on deaf children with cochlear implants. The particularity of this unique population is the extraordinary neuroplasticity they exhibit during the first years of language acquisition following implantation. Chatterjee wondered to what extent their plastic brain could adapt to the relatively poor auditory inputs delivered by implants and overcome their limitations. Despite its remarkable success in restoring hearing to deaf individuals, the cochlear implant is not yet perfect in transmitting a speech signal with as much fidelity as acoustic hearing. Much of Chatterjee’s early work was concerned with those limitations in spectro-temporal resolution, exacerbated by physiological interactions in electric stimulation patterns between multiple channels of the electrode array. Those limitations should be particularly problematic for pitch perception, and she reasoned that cochlear-implanted children must find it especially challenging to recognize intonation within sentences or within words (as in the case of tonal languages) or to perceive emotion in a speaker’s voice. Those difficulties would represent a major obstacle when learning to interact with the primary caregiver, as well as peers, to communicate mood or intent, which has implications all the way to the development of theory of mind and psycho-social constructs.
