= Floyd R. Watson =

American experimental physicist (1872–1974)

- Watson at the Fourth Conference International Union for Cooperation in Solar Research at Mount Wilson Observatory, 1910
- Born: 23 April 1872; Lawrence, Kansas
- Died: 18, January 1974
- Education: University of California, Los Angeles; Cornell University
- Scientific career
- Fields: Experimental physics
- Workplaces: University of Illinois Urbana-Champaign

Floyd Rowe Watson (April 23, 1872, Lawrence, Kansas – January 18, 1974) was an American experimental physicist, known for his research on acoustics and the acoustical design of buildings.

== Biography ==
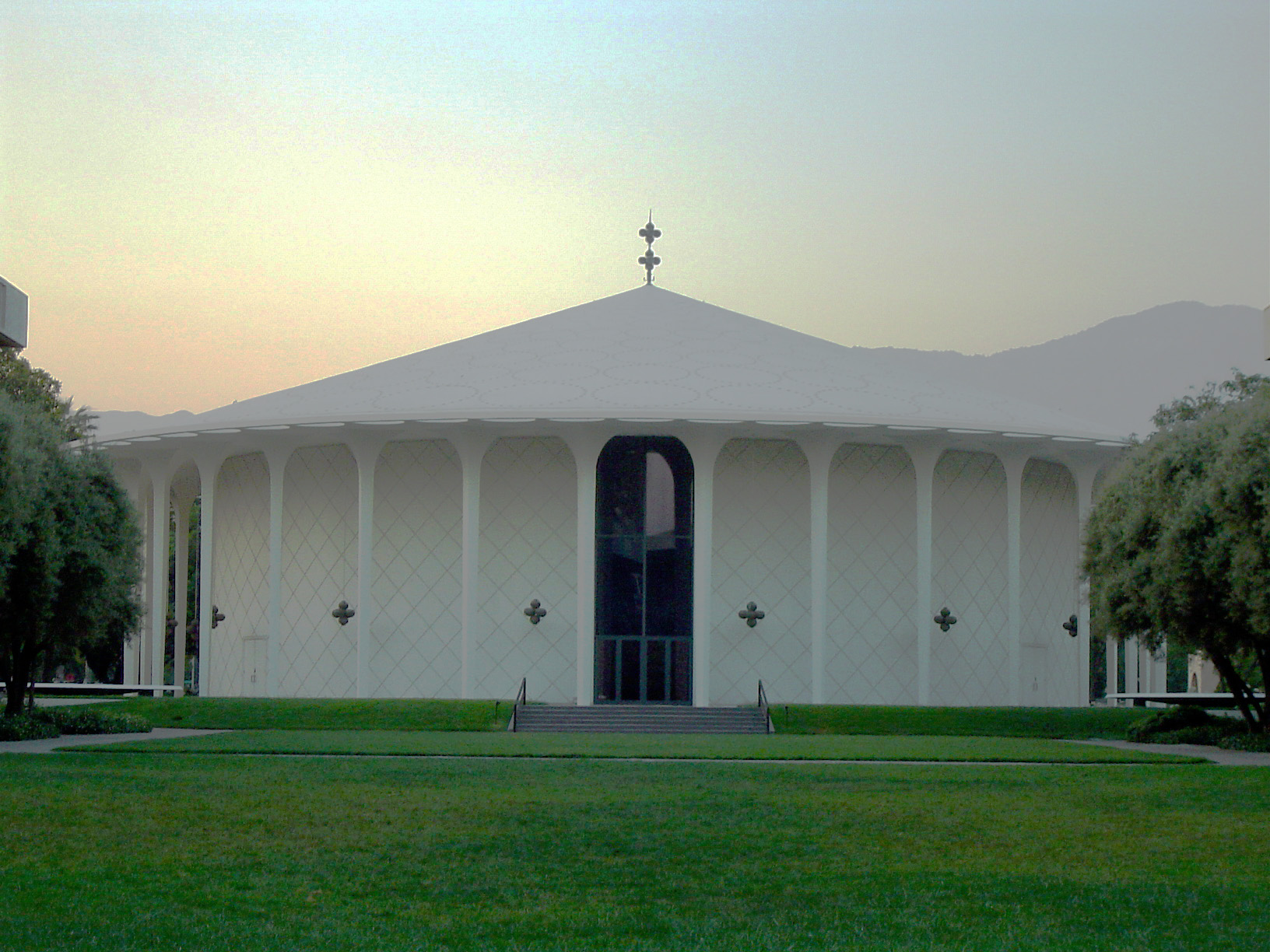
Beckman Auditorium, Caltech campus

After graduating from Los Angeles High School, Floyd R. Watson worked for several Los Angeles County newspapers, including the Los Angeles Times. He received in 1899 his B.S. from Los Angeles Normal School, now known as the University of California, Los Angeles (UCLA). He received in 1902 his Ph.D. in physics from Cornell University with thesis Surface tension at the interface of two liquids determined experimentally by the method of ripple waves. His Ph.D. thesis advisor was Edward Leamington Nichols. At the University of Illinois Urbana-Champaign, Watson was from 1902 to 1904 an instructor, from 1904 to 1915 an assistant professor, from 1915 to 1917 an associate professor, and from 1917 to 1940 a professor of experimental physics, retiring in 1940 as professor emeritus. He worked as an acoustical consultant until he was over ninety years old.

In approximately the first week of September 1928, Watson and Wallace Waterfall (1900–1974), a former doctoral student of Watson, were invited by UCLA's Vern Oliver Knudsen to an evening dinner at Knudsen's beach club near Los Angeles. The three physicists decided to form a society of acoustical engineers interested in architectural acoustics. Wallace Waterfall sent letters to thirteen men. On December 10, 1928, letters were sent to all thirteen of the previously chosen men and to three additional men. Harvey Fletcher offered the use of the Bell Telephone Laboratories at 463 West Street in Manhattan as a meeting place for an organizational, initial meeting to be held on December 27, 1928. The meeting was attended by about forty scientists and engineers who started the Acoustical Society of America (ASA). The first issue of the Journal of the Acoustical Society of America was published in October 1929. Watson was the editor-in-chief of the Journal of the Acoustical Society of America from 1929 to 1939 and the ASA's president from 1939 to 1941.

Watson was elected in 1909 a Fellow of the American Association for the Advancement of Science.

In 1902 he married Estelle Jane Barden. They had two sons. Their younger son, Robert Barden Watson, was one of the U.S. Army's leading experts on electronics. Their elder son, Norman Allen Watson, was a UCLA physics professor, who did research on acoustics.

== Selected publications ==
=== Articles ===
- Watson, F. R. (1912). "The Inefficiency of Wires as a Means of Curing Defective Acoustics of Auditoriums". Science. 35 (908): 833–834. Bibcode:1912Sci....35..833W. doi:10.1126/science.35.908.833. PMID 17842468.
- —— (1924). "Acoustics of auditoriums". Journal of the Franklin Institute. 198: 73–83. doi:10.1016/S0016-0032(24)90009-3.
- —— (1926). "Optimum Conditions for Music in Rooms". Science. 64 (1652): 209–210. Bibcode:1926Sci....64..209W. doi:10.1126/science.64.1652.209. PMID 17755732.
- —— (1927). "Acoustics of Motion Picture Theaters". Transactions of the Society of Motion Picture Engineers. 11 (32): 641–650. doi:10.5594/J13150.
- —— (1928). "Acoustics of Auditoriums". Science. 67 (1735): 335–338. Bibcode:1928Sci....67..335W. doi:10.1126/science.67.1735.335. PMID 17735126.
- —— (1930). "Acoustics of Lincoln Hall Theater at the University of Illinois". The Journal of the Acoustical Society of America. 2 (1): 103–105. Bibcode:1930ASAJ....2..103W. doi:10.1121/1.1915242.
- —— (1933). "A Survey of Modern Acoustics". Review of Scientific Instruments. 4 (5): 268–270. Bibcode:1933RScI....4..268W. doi:10.1063/1.1749116.
- —— (1934). "Acoustics of a Board of Trade Room". The Journal of the Acoustical Society of America. 5 (3): 220. Bibcode:1934ASAJ....5..220W. doi:10.1121/1.1915655.
- —— (1941). "Ideal Auditorium Acoustics". The Journal of the Acoustical Society of America. 12 (3): 470. Bibcode:1941ASAJ...12..470W. doi:10.1121/1.1902212.

=== Books & pamphlets ===
- Watson, Floyd Rowe (1906). Elementary laboratory course in physical measurement. Lewisburg, Pennsylvania: Stephens Publishing Company; 137 pages; "Printed for students in the first year laboratory course in general physics at the University of Illinois."
- —— (1922). Sound-proof partitions: an investigation of the acoustic properties of various building materials with practical applications. University of Illinois bulletin; v. 19, no. 28. Urbana, Illinois: University of Illinois Engineering Experiment Station; 85 pages
- —— (1923). Acoustics of Buildings: Including Acoustics of Auditoriums and Sound-proofing of Rooms. New York: J. Wiley & Sons.
- —— (1935). Sound: an elementary textbook on the science of sound and the phenomena of hearing. New York: J. Wiley & Sons; xi+219 pages
