= Earl Schubert =

Psychoacoustics specialist

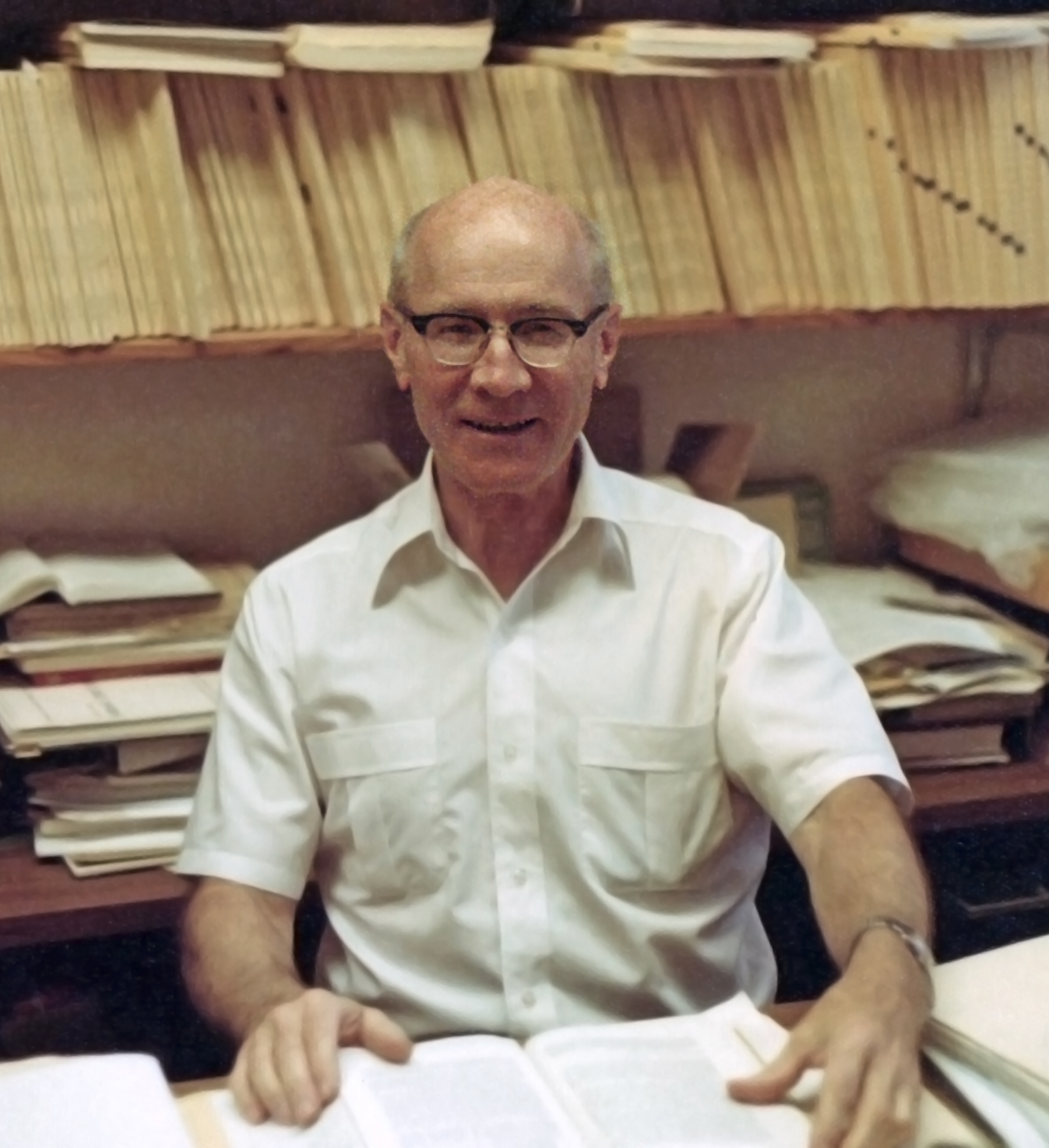
Earl Schubert at his desk in Stanford's Medical School, circa 1977, with a bookshelf of JASA behind

Earl D. Schubert (November 8, 1916 – December 1, 1999) was an American academic scientist specialized in psychoacoustics. He was a leading authority on hearing, especially musical and binaural psychoacoustics.

Schubert got his start on psychoacoustics in the US Army, working on speech communication in noise during World War II. After receiving a Ph.D. at the University of Iowa in 1948, he started his career in academia at the University of Michigan, returning to Iowa in 1951. In 1955 he became the director of the Cleveland Hearing and Speech Center where he continued to work on speech intelligibility. He moved to Indiana University in 1960, and to Stanford University in 1964, where he remained for the rest of his life. After retiring from the Medical School in 1987, as professor emeritus he devoted his time to helping students at CCRMA.

== Prominent works ==
In 1956, Schubert showed that speech on headphones in a noisy environment could be made more intelligible by delaying the signal to one ear, or by presenting with opposite polarities in the two ears.

From 1957 through 1970, Schubert co-edited the "References to Contemporary Papers on Acoustics" section of the Journal of the Acoustical Society of America.

Schubert's 1979 book Psychological Acoustics reprints many classic papers in the field, including J. C. R. Licklider's 1951 "A Duplex Theory of Pitch Perception".

His 1980 monograph Hearing: Its Function and Dysfunction is a classic in the hearing field, summarizing years of research.
