= Clarence S. Clay Jr. =

American geophysicist (1923–2011)

- Born: November 2, 1923
- Died: April 4, 2011
- Education: Kansas State University
- Known for: Acoustics
- Scientific career
- Fields: Geophysics
- Workplaces: University of Wisconsin-Madison
- Doctoral advisor: Prof. Gibson Winas University of Wisconsin-Madison

Clarence Samuel Clay Jr. (1923–2011) was an American geophysicist specialized in oceanography. He was known for his contributions in acoustics. Although he signed most of his papers "C.S. Clay", he was called simply, "Clay" by his friends, students, and colleagues. He was also known as "Clay Clay".

== Biography ==
Clay grew up living in Emporia, Kansas and he was known as C. S. During grade school C.S was a flying model airplane designer, builder, and competitor. To become successful, he taught himself the necessary mathematics he needed. In high school, he was a particularly good student in chemistry and music. He graduated from Emporia High School in June 1941.

That fall he became a freshman at Kansas State College (now Kansas State University), but left to serve in the Army during World War II. After basic training, he was placed in specialized programs at the University of Cincinnati and Ohio State University. He was then assigned to the Army Signal Corps to maintain and operate electronic equipment. While in Ohio, he met Jane Edwards and, after completion of Clay's training, they were married in 1945. Clay's group was chosen to maintain electronic equipment during the planned invasion of Japan.

After separation from the Army, Clay completed both the Bachelor's (1947) and Masters (1948) degrees in physics at Kansas State University. At the University of Wisconsin-Madison, his doctoral dissertation under Professor Gibson Winas was entitled, “Field Strengths and Spectra of High Frequency Gas Discharges.” After completing the PhD in 1951, Clay taught for one year at the University of Wyoming, but then joined the Carter Oil Company Research Laboratory in Tulsa, Oklahoma, as a Research Physicist to develop new methods for geophysical exploration . In 1955 Clay moved to the Hudson Laboratories of Columbia University where he was a Senior Research Associate for marine geophysical research. Here Clay worked in group specializing in marine acoustics that group located several important U.S. and Russian sunken ships. At Hudson Labs, he presumably had access to one of the early IBM 650 computers. With his colleague Ivan Tolstoy, he coauthored a monograph on ocean acoustics published in 1966.

Clay worked on problems in signal processing that led to five patents between 1959 and 1967. His 1959 patent for a “multiple transducer array … of particular utility in the area of seismic prospecting” US Patent 2,906,363 has been referenced as recently as 2000 by several petroleum companies. His 1964 patent for “Signal Correlation Method and Means” US Patent 3,158,830 for "oceanic depth measurement" refers “not only to measurements of the depth of the water, but also to the depth measurements of the earth layers below”. It led, years later, to a Navy sonar project for mapping the underside of the ice pack floating in the Arctic Ocean to determine if submarines could safely navigate beneath it. Similarly, the 1967 patent for “Directional Filtering of Summed Arrays” for “maximization of signal output by means of a matched-filter technique” US Patent 3,307,190 with Robert A. Frosch explicitly recognizes the mathematical similarity between sound waves in water and electromagnetic waves in air. Indeed, the patent refers to the sonar and radar "arts", respectively, anticipating — before digital computers — many techniques, such as “time reversal”, that continue to see widespread application and extensive research today.

Clay joined the geophysics faculty at the University of Wisconsin-Madison in 1968. As faculty members in the graduate program in Oceanography and Limnology, Clay and Professor John Magnuson developed methods for tracking aquatic organisms. They conducted cruises off Cape Hatteras using acoustical techniques to study the distribution of organisms along the northern edge of the Gulf Stream front. They then extended their research over deeper water beyond the Continental Shelf. Clay also conducted a geophysical survey of the Extremely Low Frequency antenna array in northern Wisconsin that was used for communication with ships anywhere on Earth.

While at University of Wisconsin-Madison, Clay published a second edition of the Tolstoy and Clay monograph and two editions (1977 and 1998) of another monograph on acoustical oceanography with former Hudson colleague, H. Medwin. These two books have appeared in Russian translations and are the international standard references for marine acoustics. Clay also published a textbook for exploration seismology (1990). In 1993, the Acoustical Society of America recognized Clay's preeminence by awarding him its silver medal, "for contributions to understanding acoustic propagation in layered waveguides, scattering from the ocean's boundaries and marine life, and ocean parameters and processes".

Prof. Clarence S. Clay advised 17 graduate students, including 12 Ph.D. theses and 10 Masters' theses, at the University of Wisconsin-Madison.
