= Richard H. Lyon =

American acoustical engineer (1929–2019)

Richard H. Lyon (August 24, 1929 – January 21, 2019) was an American acoustical engineer.

== Early life ==
Lyon was born in Evansville, Indiana, on August 24, 1929, to parents Chester and Gertrude Lyon.

He attended Evansville College in his hometown, graduating in 1952 with a bachelor's degree in physics. Lyon pursued further study in the subject at the Massachusetts Institute of Technology. Upon earning his doctorate in 1955, Lyon joined the faculty of the University of Minnesota, where he was assistant professor of electrical engineering.

== Career ==
After three years of teaching, Lyon went to the University of Manchester for post doctoral study funded by the National Science Foundation. Lyon then worked at Bolt, Beranek, and Newman for ten years. He joined MIT faculty as a lecturer in 1963, and was made professor of mechanical engineering in 1970. While teaching, Lyon founded Cambridge Collaborative, Inc. and RH Lyon Corp. Lyon was elected to membership of the National Academy of Engineering "for development of statistical energy analysis and machinery diagnostic techniques" in 1995, the same year he ended his career in academia and won the Rayleigh Medal.

He was elected to fellowship of the Acoustical Society of America and has received the ASA Silver (1998) and Gold Medals (2003), as well as the Gold Medal from the Acoustical Society of India.

== Death ==
Lyon died on January 21, 2019, aged 89. He is survived by his wife, Jean Lyon, and his three children, Kathy Davis, Geoffrey Lyon, and Suzanne (Sue) Lyon Riggle.
