= Mardi Hastings =

American mechanical engineer

Mardi Cox Hastings is an American mechanical engineer specializing in undersea acoustics, including "the generation, propagation, and biological effects of anthropogenic sound in the marine environment" and especially the effects of human-generated sound on fish. She is a retired professor at Georgia Tech and a former president of the Acoustical Society of America.

== Education and career ==
Hastings was a mechanical engineering student at the Ohio State University, where she received both a bachelor's degree and a master's degree. Next, she became the first woman to receive a Ph.D. in mechanical engineering from Georgia Tech, in 1987.

She returned to Ohio State as a faculty member in mechanical engineering and biomedical engineering, before moving in 2002 to the Office of Naval Research. After this, she became a professor of mechanical engineering at Pennsylvania State University and then Georgia Tech, until retiring in 2014.

She served as president of the Acoustical Society of America from 2011 to 2012. She has also chaired the Noise Control and Acoustics Division of the American Society of Mechanical Engineers.

== Book ==
Hastings is a coauthor, with Whitlow Au, of the book Principles of Marine Bioacoustics (Springer, 2008).

== Recognition ==
Hastings received the 1993 Ralph R. Teetor Educational Award of SAE International. She was named as a Fellow of the Acoustical Society of America in 1996. In 2005 the U.S. Federal Highway Administration gave her their Environmental Excellence Award. She was the 2011 recipient of the Per Brüel Gold Medal for Noise Control and Acoustics of the American Society of Mechanical Engineers (ASME), and the 2014 Rayleigh Lecturer of the ASME Noise Control and Acoustics Division.
