= ASA Gold Medal =

The ASA Gold Medal is an annual award presented by the Acoustical Society of America (ASA) to individuals in recognition of outstanding contributions to acoustics. The Gold Medal was first presented in 1954 and is the highest award of the ASA. Past recipients, which include the Nobel Laureate Georg von Békésy, are listed below.

== Recipients ==
Year	Name	Rationale	Reference
1954	Wallace Waterfall	No rationale given	
1955	Floyd A. Firestone	No rationale given	
1957	Harvey Fletcher	No rationale given	
1959	Edward C. Wente	No rationale given	
1961	Georg von Békésy	"For his deft proficiency in the experimental art which has laid open the ear and resolved the mysteries of its inner workings" (Note: Abstracted.)	
1962	R. Bruce Lindsay	"For major contributions to the knowledge of physical acoustics through research and authorship; for teaching and training acousticians; and for sustained service to the Society as an officer and Editor-in-Chief of its publications"	
1965	Hallowell Davis	"For his many contributions to our understanding of the workings of the hearing mechanism; for his versatile concern with bioacoustics, psychoacoustics, audiology, physiology, and otolaryngology; and for his service to the Society"	
1967	Vern Oliver Knudsen	"For his research into the propagation of acoustical waves through the air and the sea; for his contributions to the understanding of the communication of speech and music and his expert application of this knowledge in the field of hearing and architectural acoustics; and for his service to the Society as founder and officer"	
1969	Frederick Vinton Hunt	"For his extensive contributions to the science and technology of acoustics in the fields of architecture, engineering, and signal processing; for his creative leadership in underwater sound and its application to the security of our nation; and for his service to the Society"	
1971	Warren P. Mason	"For his electromechanical filters which are the keystone of carrier-frequency telephony; investigations of piezoelectric crystals, ceramics and the properties of materials"	
1973	Philip M. Morse	"For his preeminent accomplishments in the field of vibration"	
1975	Leo Beranek	"For leadership in developing, in the United States and abroad, the desire and the capability for achieving good acoustics in communications, workplaces, concert halls, and communities"	
1977	Raymond W. B. Stephens	"For extensive contributions to the advancement of acoustics in his own and many other countries: as a physics teacher and experimentalist; as an author and editor; as a founder and leader of acoustical societies; and above all as a research supervisor who has taught and inspired a generation of acoustics students and guided them in the attainment of excellence"	
1979	Richard Bolt	"For outstanding contributions to acoustics through research, teaching, and professional leadership, and for distinguished administrative and advisoryservice to science, engineering, and government"	
1981	Harry F. Olson	"For his innovative and lasting contributions in acoustic transduction, sound reproduction, electronic music and speech synthesis, and his service to the Society"	
1982	Isadore Rudnick	"For his ingenious and masterly contributions to acoustical research and teaching, and for his distinguished leadership and service to the Society"	
1983	Martin Greenspan	"For wide ranging and superlative contributions to experimental and theoretical physical acoustics, including ultrasonically induced cavitation in liquids and sound propagation in solids, liquids, and gases"	
1984	Robert T. Beyer	"For contributions to acoustics through his teaching, research, and translations and for his dedicated service to the Acoustical Society of America"	
1985	Laurence Batchelder	"For significant contributions to underwater acoustics, to acoustical standards, and to the Acoustical Society of America as Fellow, officer, and patent reviewer"	
1986	James L. Flanagan	"For contributions to and leadership in digital speech communications"	
1987	Cyril M. Harris	"For service to the Society; for improved understanding of absorption of sound in gases; and for contributions to the science and practice of architectural acoustics"	
1988	Arthur H. Benade	"For pioneering work in the science and art of musical acoustics, emphasizing the interactions among performer, instrument, and listener" (Note: Given posthumously.)	
1988	Richard K. Cook	"For outstanding seminal contributions to diverse areas of acoustics and to standardization"	
1989	Lothar W. Cremer	"For identifying and solving key problems in acoustics and acoustical engineering and for the impact of his teachings and writings"	
1990	Eugen J. Skudrzyk	"For his extensive contributions to the advancement of acoustics, particularly structural and underwater acoustics, as a researcher, author and educator"	
1991	Manfred R. Schroeder	"For theoretical and practical contributions to human communication through innovative application of mathematics to speech, hearing, and concert hall acoustics"	
1992	Ira Hirsh	"For contributions to the understanding of the auditory process"	
1993	David T. Blackstock	"For contributions to the understanding of finite-amplitude sound propagation and worldwide leadership in nonlinear acoustics"	
1994	David M. Green	"For contributions to knowledge, theory, and methodology in audition"	
1995	Kenneth N. Stevens	"For leadership and outstanding contributions to the acoustics of speech production and perception"	
1996	Ira Dyer	"For contributions to ocean acoustics, structural acoustics, and aeroacoustics, and for dedicated service to the Society"	
1997	K. Uno Ingard	"For contributions to and teaching of physical acoustics and noise control"	
1998	Floyd Dunn	"For creative contributions to fundamental knowledge of ultrasonic propagation in, and interactions with, biological media"	
1999	Henning E. von Gierke	"For contributions to bioacoustics, psychoacoustics, vibrations, and for leadership in national and international acoustical standards"	
2000	Murray Strasberg	"For contributions to hydroacoustics, acoustic cavitation and turbulence noise, and for dedicated service to the Society"	
2001	Herman Medwin	"For innovative research in ocean acoustics and leadership and service to the Society"	
2002	Robert E. Apfel	"For fundamental contributions to physical acoustics and biomedical ultrasound and for innovative leadership in electronic publishing"	
2002	Tony F.W. Embleton	"For fundamental contributions to understanding outdoor sound propagation and noise control and for leadership in the Society"	
2003	Richard H. Lyon	"For sustained leadership and extensive contributions in the application of statistical concepts to structural acoustics and noise"	
2004	Chester M. McKinney	"For pioneering research and leadership in underwater acoustic and high resolution sonar, and for dedicated service to the Society"	
2005	Allan D. Pierce	"For contributions to physical, environmental, and structural acoustics, acoustics education, and leadership as Editor-in-Chief of the Society"	
2006	James West	"For development of polymer electret transducers, and for leadership in acoustics and the Society"	
2007	Katherine Safford Harris	"For pioneering research and leadership in speech production and dedicated service to the Society"	
2008	Patricia K. Kuhl	"For contributions to understanding how children acquire spoken language and for leadership in the Society"	
2009	Thomas D. Rossing	"For contributions to musical acoustics, leadership in science education, and service to the Society"	
2010	Jiri Tichy	"For contributions to acoustical intensity measurement, active noise control, education in acoustics, and for service to the Society."	
2011	Eric E. Ungar	"For contributions over six decades to acoustics, vibration isolation, and noise control and for service to the society"	
2012	William Kuperman	"For contributions to leadership in underwater acoustics, mentoring generations of acousticians, and for service to the Society"	
2013	Lawrence A. Crum	"For discovery and invention in physical and biomedical acoustics, and for leadership in acoustics worldwide."	
2014	Brian C.J. Moore	"For leadership in research on human hearing and its clinical applications"	
2015	Gerhard M. Sessler	"For the development of electret and silicon-based micromachined microphones".	
2016	Whitlow W.L. Au	"For contributions to understanding underwater biosonar and for service to the Acoustical Society".	
2017	William M. Hartmann	"For contributions to research and education in psychological acoustics and service to the society".	
2018	William A. Yost	"For research on binaural hearing, pitch and modulation perception, and for service to the acoustics community".	
2019	William J. Cavanaugh	"For practical applications to building design and education in architectural acoustics, and for service to the Society".	
2020	Judy R. Dubno	"For contributions to understanding age-related hearing loss and for leadership in the acoustics community".	
2021	James F. Lynch	"For contributions to shallow ocean dynamics and acoustics, geo-acoustics and inversion, and for service to the society and its publications".	
2022	Michael J. Buckingham	"For theoretical and experimental contributions to ocean acoustics and for service to the Society".	
2023	Mark F. Hamilton	"For contributions to theoretical nonlinear acoustics, education, and for service to and leadership of the society".	

== See also ==
- List of physics awards
