= Irving Wolff =

American physicist (1894-1982)

Irving Wolff (6 July 1894 in New York City – 5 December 1982 in Princeton, New Jersey) was an American physicist and pioneer of radar.

Wolff received in 1916 a bachelor's degree in physics from Dartmouth College and in 1923 a doctorate in physics from Cornell University. He was a physics teacher at Iowa State College in 1919 and Cornell University from 1920 to 1923, later becoming the Heckscher Research Fellow. He is one of the founders of the Acoustical Society of America (ASA). He participated in ASA First Meeting along with thirty-nine other persons, at the Bell headquarters in New York City, on December 27, 1928. Early in his career, he focused on the acoustics of loudspeakers, sound systems for theaters, and high-fidelity sound.

== Career at RCA ==
In 1924 he joined the RCA Technical and Test Laboratory at 7 Van Cortlandt Park South in New York City. His first assignment was to extend the frequency range of test oscillators to allow for higher frequency tests. This sped up the process of loudspeaker testing and allowed for more accurate measurement of the frequency response. Working under David Sarnoff, Irving Wolff also developed a ten-inch diameter open cone loudspeaker to compete with Western Electric.

In 1930 he was transferred to the RCA Research Department in Camden, New Jersey, and became head of the acoustic research department of the merged RCA-Victor Company. From 1924 to 1931 he did research on acoustics. Irving Wolff was part of a committee tasked with developing standardized terminology for acoustics. He initiated in 1932 a program of microwave research and in 1934 a program of radar research.

In 1934 Wolff and his team from the research staff from the RCA-Victor Company demonstrated prototype radar equipment to the United States Army Signal Corps at Atlantic Highlands, New Jersey. Using reflected 9-centimeter radio waves, the RCA team located and followed the progress of a ship entering New York Harbor about a half mile (.8 kilometer) away. This experiment may have been the first successful demonstration in the United States of microwave radar. Irving Wolff's areas of research included wide band radar and radio antennae that could fit within the body of high speed aircraft. His research in infrared sniperscope accounted for 30 percent of non-US casualties in the battle of Okinawa.

In 1938, Dr. Wolff and his associates at RCA helped in the first installation of radar equipment in Navy combat ships. His work led to the design of an altimeter that employed radar principles. It was used in military aircraft and assault drones during World War II and in automatic homing equipment for guided missiles.

In 1946 he was appointed director of RCA's radio tube research laboratory. In 1946 Wolff and colleagues at RCA developed the basis for the Teleran System of Air Navigation for aircraft guidance and air traffic control. In 1949 the U.S. Navy awarded him the highest civilian Navy award — the Distinguished Public Service Award. In 1951 he was appointed director of research of the RCA Laboratories in Princeton and in 1954 was promoted to vice president of research. He retired from RCA in 1959 and continued to live in Princeton until his death in 1982.

Dr. Wolff held over 80 patents and made important contributions not only to microwave radar but also loudspeaker acoustics, infrared detection, and radio frequency heating. For his research efforts, the United States Navy awarded Irving Wolff with the Distinguished Public Service Award.

== Later life and death ==
Upon his death he was survived by his widow, a daughter, and two grandchildren.
