= 1965 Carmel mid-air collision =

1965 aviation accident in the United States

Trans World Airlines Flight 42 Eastern Air Lines Flight 853
Accident
- Date: December 4, 1965
- Summary: Mid-air collision due to optical illusion and pilot error
- Site: Carmel, New York, United States; 41.33°N 73.57°W
- Total fatalities: 4
- Total injuries: 50
- Total survivors: 108

First aircraft
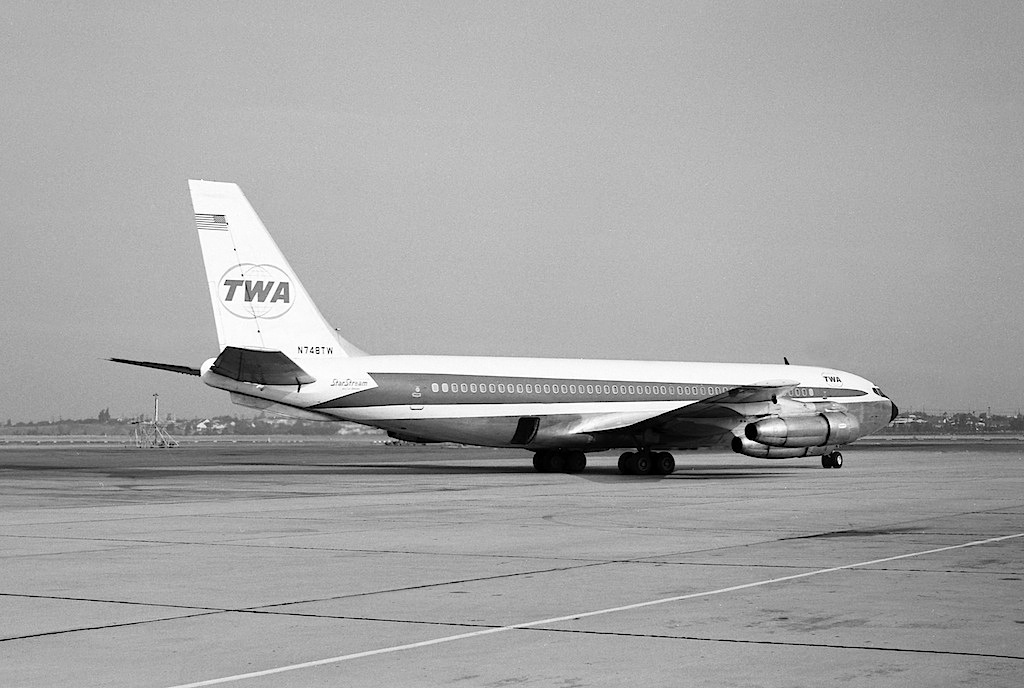
- N748TW, the Trans World Airlines Boeing 707 involved in the accident
- Type: Boeing 707-131B
- Operator: Trans World Airlines
- IATA flight No.: TW
- ICAO flight No.: TWA
- Call sign: TWA 42
- Registration: N748TW
- Flight origin: San Francisco International Airport, California, United States
- Destination: John F. Kennedy International Airport, New York, United States
- Occupants: 58
- Passengers: 51
- Crew: 7
- Fatalities: 0
- Injuries: 1
- Survivors: 58

Second aircraft
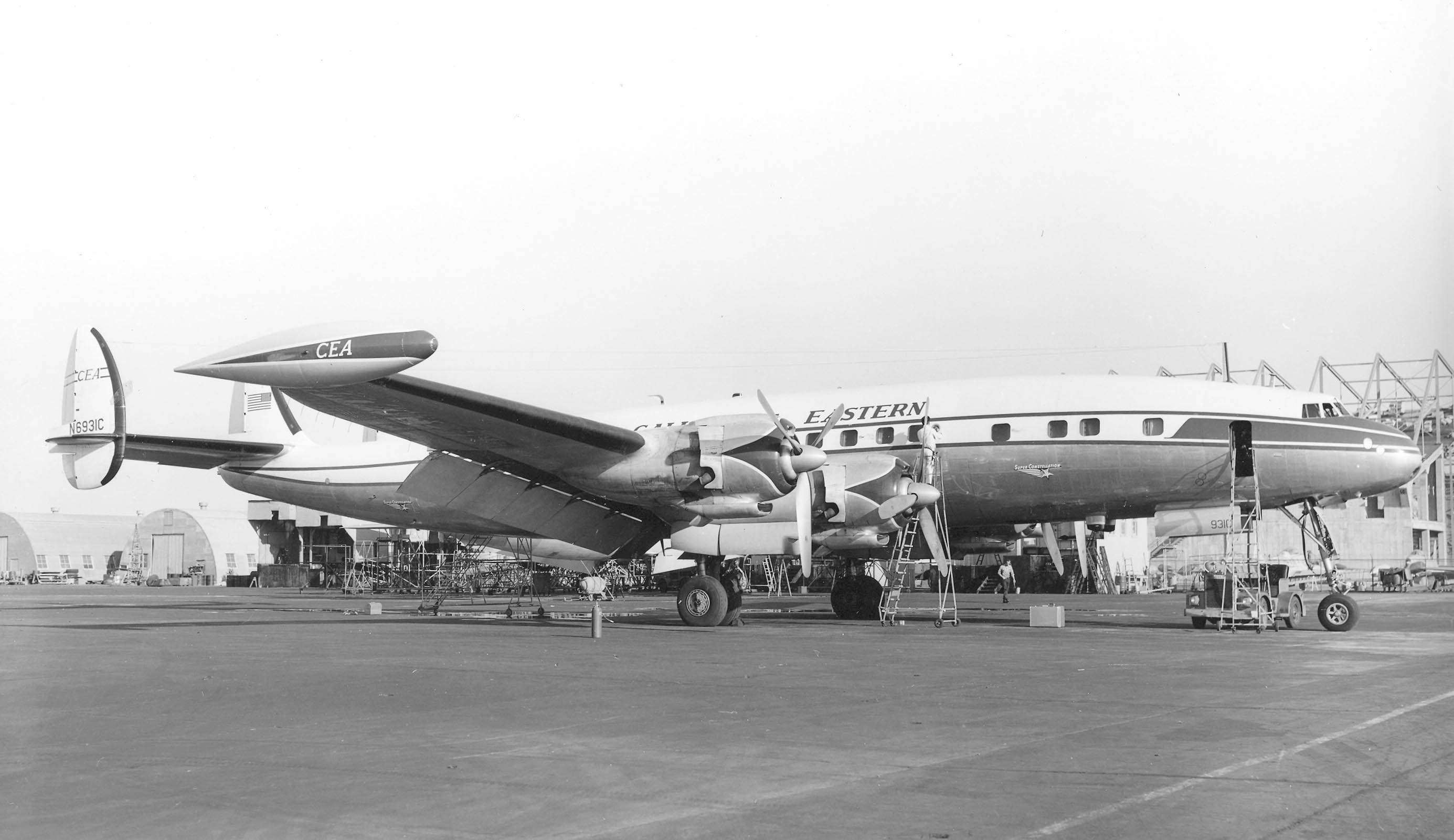
- A Lockheed Super Constellation similar to the accident aircraft.
- Type: Lockheed L-1049C Super Constellation
- Operator: Eastern Air Lines
- IATA flight No.: EA853
- ICAO flight No.: EAL853
- Call sign: EASTERN 853
- Registration: N6218C
- Flight origin: Boston Logan International Airport, Massachusetts, United States
- Destination: Newark International Airport, New Jersey, United States
- Occupants: 54
- Passengers: 49
- Crew: 5
- Fatalities: 4
- Injuries: 49
- Survivors: 50

On December 4, 1965, Trans World Airlines Flight 42, a Boeing 707 en route from San Francisco International Airport to John F. Kennedy International Airport, collided in mid-air with Eastern Air Lines Flight 853, a Lockheed Super Constellation en route from Boston Logan International Airport to Newark International Airport, New Jersey, over Carmel, New York.

TWA Flight 42 made an emergency landing at John F. Kennedy International Airport, while Eastern Air Lines Flight 853 made a crash landing on Hunt Mountain in North Salem, New York. Three passengers died, plus the Constellation's pilot, Captain Charles J. White, who had returned to the aircraft's cabin to help the last passenger evacuate.

== Background ==
=== Aircraft ===
==== Boeing aircraft and crew ====
The TWA aircraft involved, manufactured by Boeing in 1962, was a Boeing 707-131B registered as N748TW, with serial number 18387 and line number 286. Equipped with four Pratt & Whitney JT3D engines, the aircraft had logged a total of 12,965 hours and 29 minutes of flying time. In command was 45-year-old Captain Thomas H. Carroll, who had logged a total of 18,842 hours of flying time, 1,867 hours of which were logged on the Boeing 707. He joined TWA on September 24, 1945. His co-pilot was 42-year-old First Officer Leo M. Smith. He had logged a total of 12,248 hours of flying time, including 2,607 hours logged on the Boeing 707. He joined TWA on November 2, 1953. The flight engineer was 41-year-old Ernest V. Hall, who had logged a total of 11,717 hours of flying time, including 5 hours and 52 minutes logged on the Boeing 707. Four flight stewardess were also on board along with 51 passengers.

==== Constellation aircraft and crew ====
The second aircraft involved, Eastern Air Lines Flight 853, was a twelve-year-old Lockheed L-1049C Super Constellation registered as N6218C with serial number 4526. Equipped with four Wright R-3350 Duplex-Cyclone engines, it had logged a total of 32,883.76 hours of flying time. The Super Constellation was carrying 49 passengers and 5 crew members from Logan International Airport in Boston to Newark International Airport (now Newark Liberty International Airport) in Newark. The crew consisted of 42-year-old Captain Charles J. White who had logged a total of 11,508 hours of flying time, 1,947 hours of which were logged on the Super Constellation. He joined Eastern Air Lines on October 26, 1953. His co-pilot was 34-year-old First Officer Roger I. Holt Jr.. He had logged total of 8,090 hours of flying time, 899 hours of which were logged on the Super Constellation. He joined Eastern Air Lines on February 5, 1962. The flight engineer was 27-year-old Emile P. Greenway. He accumulated 1,011 flight hours, 726 hours of which were logged on the Constellation. Two stewardesses were also on board along with 49 passengers.

== Accident ==
TWA Flight 42 and Eastern Air Lines Flight 853 approached the Carmel VORTAC at the same time, with the Boeing 707 flying at 11,000 feet and the Super Constellation flying at 10,000 feet. Due to an optical illusion, the first officer of the Super Constellation believed it was on the same altitude as the Boeing 707. The Super Constellation's crew immediately began climbing to escape what they thought was an imminent collision. Their climb however, put them on a legitimate path to collide with the other aircraft.

As the Constellation emerged from a cloud puff, First Officer Roger I. Holt Jr. saw the Boeing in his right side window at the 2 o'clock position. The aircraft appeared to be converging rapidly at the same altitude. Holt shouted, "Look out," placed his hands on the control wheel, and made a rapid application of up elevator simultaneously with Captain White, causing crew members and passengers to be forced down into their seats.

=== TWA Flight 42 ===
Aboard the Boeing, the crew was preparing for arrival at JFK International, flying in clear air above an overcast sky with good visibility as they approached Carmel. The aircraft was being flown on autopilot with altitude-hold engaged, and the pilot, Capt. Thomas H. Carroll, had his left hand on the control yoke. On seeing an aircraft at his 10 o'clock position on what appeared to be a collision course, he immediately disengaged the autopilot, put the wheel hard over to the right, and pulled back on the yoke. His copilot, First Officer Leo M. Smith, also grabbed the controls and acted together with him. The aircraft rolled to the right and it became apparent that this maneuver would not allow the two aircraft to pass clear of each other, so Carroll and Smith attempted to reverse the wheel to the left and pushed on the yoke. Before the aircraft could react to the control reversal, two shocks were felt and the Boeing entered a steep dive; the Boeing's left wing had struck the tail of the Constellation and both aircraft were out of control.

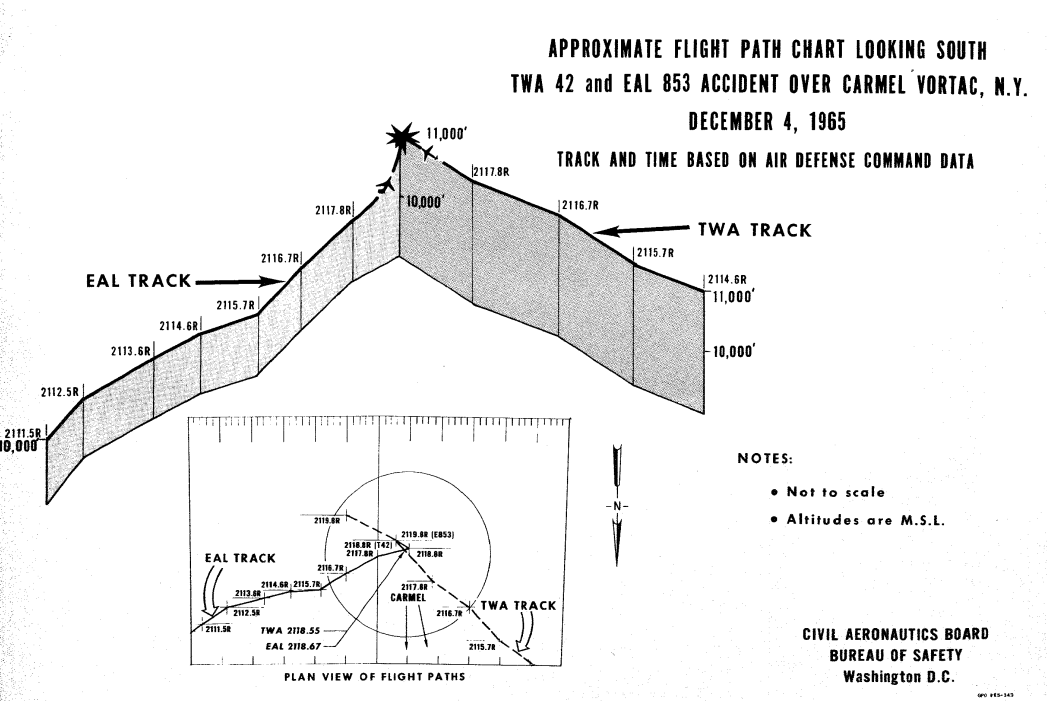
The trajectory of both flights and their point of collision

The Boeing crew recovered from the dive, declared an emergency with New York Center, and received the first of many vectors to JFK International. They performed a damage assessment and asked that crash and fire equipment stand by. The Boeing was vectored south of JFK International where it made a wide 360 degree turn to check that the landing gear was fully down and to determine how the airplane would fly at approach speeds, and made a safe landing on Runway 31L at 1640. The only injury was a bloody nose suffered by a flight attendant who was knocked off her feet in the collision.

=== Eastern Air Lines Flight 853 ===
Following the collision, the Eastern Air Lines Constellation continued to climb. The crew felt the aircraft shudder and begin a left-turning dive back into the clouds. There was no response from the controls or trim tabs, but the crew discovered that a degree of control was available by adjusting the throttles. The aircraft descended through solid clouds and a recovery was made below the clouds using throttles only. Several zooms were then made back into the clouds as the pilots attempted to gain control of their aircraft.

The pilots discovered a throttle setting that would maintain a descent in level attitude, with airspeed maintained between 125 kn (232 km/h; 144 mph) and 140 kn (260 km/h; 160 mph); the nose rose when power was increased and fell when power was decreased. Their rate of descent could be maintained at approximately 500 ft (150 m) per minute.

It was obvious to the pilots that the Constellation was badly damaged and that they needed to make an emergency landing. However, they were over mainly wooded terrain on the Connecticut-New York border, and the few fields were surrounded by stone walls, sited on sloping terrain, and not large enough. Captain White advised the passengers that the aircraft was out of control, and that a crash landing would be made.

The aircraft descended on a southwest heading over Danbury Municipal Airport, Connecticut at an altitude of 2,000 feet. Around 2 mi (3.2 km) ahead, White spotted a pasture halfway up Hunt Mountain, a 900 ft (270 m) ridge running perpendicular to the Constellation's flightpath. He aligned the aircraft using asymmetric thrust, told passengers to brace themselves, and descended into the upward-sloping hillside with wheels and flaps retracted. At the last moment he jammed the throttles forward to pitch up the aircraft's nose, letting the Constellation pancake into the 15-percent slope.

The crash-landing site was 4.2 mi (6.8 km) north of an area where numerous parts from both aircraft were later found by investigators. The first impact was on a tree that was found broken 46 ft (14 m) above the ground. 250 ft (76 m) farther on, the left wing contacted another tree, and was separated from the aircraft. The fuselage contacted the ground at the same point, and the aircraft came to rest on the slope. The fuselage had been broken into three pieces, and all the engines had been separated from their nacelles.

The cockpit and cabin crews survived the crash landing and worked both inside and outside the broken fuselage parts to evacuate the survivors from the wreckage, which was on fire. Volunteer firemen from North Salem, Ridgefield, Connecticut, and nearby communities extinguished the fire and transported the survivors to hospitals at Danbury, Connecticut; Mount Kisco, New York; and Carmel, New York, where two passengers later died of their injuries. Passenger Richard E. Foster was ejected from the plane through an emergency exit during the crash and sustained minor injuries. Firefighters later discovered two bodies in the fuselage - that of a male passenger in the forward section, whose seatbelt jammed, and that of Captain White, who had returned to the cabin to help the passenger. Both had died from smoke inhalation.

=== Notable passengers ===
Electrical engineer and physicist Warren P. Mason and his wife were among the survivors of the Constellation crash.

== Investigation ==
The investigation was conducted by the Civil Aeronautics Board (CAB). The CAB determined the probable cause was a misjudgement of altitude separation by the crew of Eastern Air Lines Flight 853 caused by an optical illusion from cloud tops, which triggered a sudden climb and a reactive evasion manoeuvre by the TWA crew.

Eastern Air Lines performed flight tests with a duplicate Super Constellation to measure climb performance under simulated emergency conditions, finding the aircraft could climb rapidly in roughly 10 to 14 seconds.

The collision, along with other mid-air incidents in the 1960s, highlighted the limits of the "see and be seen" rule as jet speeds increased in the history of aviation. It made more strict requirements for aircraft transponders, improved global radar coverage, replaced aging tracking technology and eventually modern collision-avoidance systems which are installed on both aircraft and ground.
