= Eline Tolstoy =

Dutch astronomer

Eline Tolstoy (born 1965) is a Dutch astronomer.

== Life and education ==
Eline Tolstoy was born to Ivan Tolstoy and Margie Lugthart in Scotland, where she grew up. She gained a BSc (Hons) from the University of Edinburgh in 1988. She studied at Leiden University (doctoral, 1990) and then in 1995, she received her doctorate from the University of Groningen, under the supervision of A. Saha, Piet van der Kruit and Harvey Butcher. The title of her thesis was `Modeling the resolved stellar populations of nearby dwarf galaxies'.

== Post-doctorate career ==
She worked as an ESA Postdoctoral Fellow, at ST-ECF Garching, Germany (1996–1998), followed by an ESO postdoctoral fellowship, Garching, Germany (1998–2000). She spent a year at Oxford University as Gemini Support Scientist.

She has been working at the University of Groningen since 2001. In 2007, she received a Vici grant from the Netherlands Organization for Scientific Research. She has been a full professor at the Kapteyn Institute of the University of Groningen since 2011.

Tolstoy is the Dutch project leader for the MICADO instrument that accompanies the European Extremely Large Telescope.

== Research ==
Her research interests centre mainly on understanding the formation and evolution of small dwarf galaxies by studying their resolved stellar populations. She is interested to discover what these systems can tell us about larger galaxies and their internal processes and also the clues that they may provide to our cosmological understanding of galaxy formation and evolution; right from the earliest phases up to the present day. This is often called "Local Group Cosmology", or "Stellar Archaeology". Tolstoy prefers the term "Galactic Palaeontology".

== Awards ==
- 2007: Pastor Schmeits Prize from the Kapteyn Astronomical Institute
