= Pioneers of Underwater Acoustics Medal =

The Pioneers of Underwater Acoustics Medal is awarded by the Acoustical Society of America in recognition of "an outstanding contribution to the science of underwater acoustics, as evidenced by publication of research results in professional journals or by other accomplishments in the field". The award was named in honor of H. J. W. Fay, Reginald Fessenden, Harvey Hayes, G. W. Pierce, and Paul Langevin.

== Recipients ==
- 1959 - Harvey C. Hayes - For outstanding contributions to the science of underwater acoustics. His far sighted recognition of the challenging technical problems in this branch of acoustics and the potentiality of the application of their solution to the defense needs of the Nation resulted in the first sustained research program in underwater sound.
- 1961 - Albert B. Wood - For pioneering leadership in underwater sound; the development of the cathode-ray oscillograph and its adaptation to the study of underwater explosions; his invention of the magneto-strictive depth recorder; and his studies of shallow-water sound transmission.
- 1963 - J. Warren Horton - For his pioneering contributions to the knowledge and practice of underwater acoustics as scientist, and teacher, and administrator; and particularly for his painstaking and thorough organization of the science of underwater acoustics and its presentation in the book "Fundamentals of Sonar."
- 1965 - Frederick V. Hunt - For his pioneering contributions to underwater acoustics as a scientist, innovator, teacher, and administrator; and particularly for his unceasing efforts directed toward greater scientific understanding and more effective exploitation of sound in the sea.
- 1970 - Harold L. Saxton - For his contributions to both knowledge and practice of underwater acoustics, and particularly for innovative solutions to problems of signal processing and sonar systems and transducers.
- 1973 - Carl Eckart - For his consummate skill, insight, and clarity in bringing to others the theoretical foundations for understanding the principles of underwater sound and acoustic signal processing, and for his leadership, wise counsel, and kindness in helping others to pursue the unsolved problems of the sea.
- 1980 - Claude W. Horton, Sr. - For his contributions in underwater acoustics in the field of propagation, reflection, and scattering, signal processing, particularly methods in acoustic data treatment and interpretation, and especially for his contribution as a teacher and friend of scientists.
- 1982 - Arthur O. Williams, Jr. - For his contribution to the theory of normal mode propagation of sound in the ocean, to the theory of sound radiation from piston sources, and to the education of graduates and undergraduates.
- 1985 - Fred N. Spiess - For his leadership and insight in applying acoustics to study the ocean and the sea floor, for his many ingenious scientific and engineering contributions; for his introduction of students, scientists, and many others to underwater acoustics.
- 1988 - Robert J. Urick - For his book "Principles of Underwater Sound" and his many experiments on sound propagation, scattering, reverberation, and ambient noise.
- 1990 - Ivan Tolstoy - For innovative studies in oceanic, atmospheric and seismic wave propagation.
- 1993 - Homer P. Bucker - For ground-breaking work integrating signal processing and acoustic modeling.
- 1995 - William A. Kuperman - For the development and application of models for ocean acoustic propagation and scattering.
- 2000 - Darrell R. Jackson - For work on acoustic time reversal techniques and scattering from the ocean sea floor and sea surface.
- 2002 - Frederick D. Tappert - For application of the parabolic equation to underwater acoustic propagation.
- 2005 - Henrik Schmidt - For pioneering contributions in numerical modeling and at-sea experiments in underwater acoustics.
- 2007 - William M. Carey - For contributions to understanding ocean ambient noise and in defining the limits of acoustic array performance in the ocean.
- 2010 - George V. Frisk - For contributions to quantifying acoustic interactions with the seabed.
- 2014 - Michael B. Porter - For contributions to underwater acoustic modeling.
- 2017 - Michael J. Buckingham - For contributions to the understanding of ocean ambient noise and marine sediment.
- 2021 - Finn B. Jensen - For contributions to ocean acoustic modeling and model data validation.
