= Maya Tolstoy =

Marine geologist

- Education: University of Edinburgh (BS); Scripps Institution of Oceanography (PhD)
- Occupation: Marine geophysicist
- Awards: Women of Discovery Award

Maya Tolstoy (Russian: Толста́я, romanized: Tolstaya) is a marine geophysicist known for her work on earthquakes in the deep sea. From Fall 2018 through December 2019 she was the Interim Executive Vice President and Dean of the Faculty of Arts and Sciences at Columbia University. Between 2022 and June 2025, she was the Maggie Walker Dean in the College of the Environment at the University of Washington.

== Biography ==
Maya Tolstoy was born in New York to Ivan Tolstoy and Margie Lugthart and grew up in Scotland. She was interested in both science and theater while growing up, but a fascination with earthquakes led her to a career in geoscience. Tolstoy received her B.S. in geophysics from the University of Edinburgh in 1988 and earned a Ph.D. from Scripps Institution of Oceanography in 1994. Following her Ph.D., she was first a postdoctoral research at Scripps Institution of Oceanography and then at Lamont–Doherty Earth Observatory. In 1996 she joined the faculty at Lamont–Doherty Earth Observatory, and was promoted to professor in 2016. In January 2022 she started her position as the Maggie Walker Dean of the College of the Environment at the University of Washington.

== Research ==
Tolstoy is known for her research using sound in the ocean to study deep-sea earthquakes. Her early research investigated a 2006 undersea eruption on the East Pacific Rise. While many of her instruments were trapped in lava, enough could be recovered to track the sequence of events that led to the eruption. Her subsequent research has examined earthquakes at Axial Seamount, the connections between tides and deep-sea earthquakes, and the along-axis flow of fluids at the East Pacific Rise. Tolstoy's research has linked changes in sea level with patterns of earthquake activity in the deep sea, research which has implications for the release of carbon dioxide, a greenhouse gas, into the atmosphere.

In addition to her research, Tolstoy led an initiative defining issues encountered by women in science that culminated in a 2018 report that presented issues at Columbia University, and she has worked to overcome issues in unequal treatment of women and minorities in hiring for academic positions. Tolstoy was also in the 2005 James Cameron film about the deep ocean Aliens of the Deep, and was a finalist in the 2009 astronaut interview process at NASA.

== Selected publications ==
- Crone, Timothy J.; Tolstoy, Maya (29 October 2010). "Magnitude of the 2010 Gulf of Mexico Oil Leak". Science. 330 (6004): 634. Bibcode:2010Sci...330..634C. doi:10.1126/science.1195840. PMID 20929734. S2CID 5722715.
- Tolstoy, Maya; Harding, Alistair J.; Orcutt, John A. (29 October 1993). "Crustal Thickness on the Mid-Atlantic Ridge: Bull's-Eye Gravity Anomalies and Focused Accretion". Science. 262 (5134): 726–729. Bibcode:1993Sci...262..726T. doi:10.1126/science.262.5134.726. PMID 17812339. S2CID 36743776.
- Tolstoy, M.; Cowen, J. P.; Baker, E. T.; Fornari, D. J.; Rubin, K. H.; Shank, T. M.; Waldhauser, F.; Bohnenstiehl, D. R.; Forsyth, D. W.; Holmes, R. C.; Love, B.; Perfit, M. R.; Weekly, R. T.; Soule, S. A.; Glazer, B. (22 December 2006). "A Sea-Floor Spreading Event Captured by Seismometers". Science. 314 (5807): 1920–1922. Bibcode:2006Sci...314.1920T. doi:10.1126/science.1133950. PMID 17124289. S2CID 10275659.
- Tolstoy, Maya; Vernon, Frank L.; Orcutt, John A.; Wyatt, Frank K. (1 June 2002). "Breathing of the seafloor: Tidal correlations of seismicity at Axial volcano". Geology. 30 (6): 503–506. Bibcode:2002Geo....30..503T. doi:10.1130/0091-7613(2002)030<0503:BOTSTC>2.0.CO;2. ISSN 0091-7613.
- Tolstoy, M. (5 February 2015). "Mid-ocean ridge eruptions as a climate valve". Geophysical Research Letters. 42 (5): 1346–1351. Bibcode:2015GeoRL..42.1346T. doi:10.1002/2014GL063015. S2CID 55300326.

== Awards and honors ==
In 2009, Tolstoy received a Women of Discovery Award for her work on deep-sea exploration. She was a 2012 invited speaker at the Nobel Conference, and delivered the 2016 Francis Birch Lecture at the American Geophysical Union meeting.
