= Arthur H. Benade =

American acoustician (1925–1987)

Arthur H. Benade (January 2, 1925 – August 4, 1987) was an American physicist and acoustician, researcher, professor, and author. He is best known for his research on the physics of woodwinds and brass instruments, and for two books, Horns, Strings, and Harmony (1960), and Fundamentals of Musical Acoustics (1976). He was a professor at Case Institute of Technology (later Case Western Reserve University), in Cleveland, Ohio, from 1952 to 1987.

== Biography ==
Benade was born in Chicago and served in the United States Army Air Forces from 1943 to 1945. He participated in the Manhattan Project where he worked on electronics. Benade earned his B.A. and Ph.D. degrees at Washington University in St. Louis, where his research for his doctorate degree focused on cosmic rays. Benade became a professor at Case Institute of Technology where he worked on nuclear physics and instrumentation.

Benade's fascination with musical acoustics led to the publication of two books on the subject, Horns, Strings, and Harmony (1960), and Fundamentals of Musical Acoustics (1976). He also made Baroque flutes utilizing conical bores and Boehm fingering systems. His research papers are at Stanford University.

Benade was awarded the Silver Medal in Engineering Acoustics by the Acoustical Society of America in 1984 for "pioneering research on the acoustics of brass and woodwind instruments and for leadership of a generation of musical acousticians", and the Gold Medal posthumously in 1988 for "pioneering work in the science and art of musical acoustics, emphasizing the interactions among performer, instrument, and listener."
