= Biot–Tolstoy–Medwin diffraction model =

In applied mathematics, the Biot–Tolstoy–Medwin (BTM) diffraction model describes edge diffraction. Unlike the uniform theory of diffraction (UTD), BTM does not make the high frequency assumption (in which edge lengths and distances from source and receiver are much larger than the wavelength). BTM sees use in acoustic simulations.

== Impulse response ==
The impulse response according to BTM is given as follows:

The general expression for sound pressure is given by the convolution integral

$$p(t) = \int_0^\infty h(\tau) q (t - \tau) \, d \tau$$

where $q(t)$ represents the source signal, and $h(t)$ represents the impulse response at the receiver position. The BTM gives the latter in terms of

- the source position in cylindrical coordinates $( r_S, \theta_S, z_S )$ where the $z$-axis is considered to lie on the edge and $\theta$ is measured from one of the faces of the wedge.
- the receiver position $( r_R, \theta_R, z_R )$
- the (outer) wedge angle $\theta_W$ and from this the wedge index $\nu = \pi / \theta_W$
- the speed of sound $c$

as an integral over edge positions $z$

$$h(\tau) = -\frac{\nu}{4\pi} \sum_{\phi_i = \pi \pm \theta_S \pm \theta_R} \int_{z_1}^{z_2} \delta\left(\tau - \frac{m+l}{c}\right) \frac{\beta_i}{ml} \, dz$$

where the summation is over the four possible choices of the two signs, $m$ and $l$ are the distances from the point $z$ to the source and receiver respectively, and $\delta$ is the Dirac delta function.

$$\beta_i = \frac{\sin (\nu \phi_i)}{\cosh(\nu \eta) - \cos(\nu \phi_i)}$$

where

$$\eta = \cosh^{-1} \frac{ml + (z - z_S)(z - z_R)}{r_S r_R}$$
