= Thomas G. Barnes =

American creationist

- Born: August 14, 1911; US
- Died: October 21, 2001 (aged 90); El Paso, Texas
- Education: Hardin-Simmons University; Brown University
- Known for: Young Earth creationism
- Scientific career
- Fields: Physicist

Thomas G. Barnes (August 14, 1911 – October 23, 2001) was an American creationist, who argued in support of his religious belief in a young Earth by making the faulty scientific claims that the Earth's magnetic field was consistently decaying.

== Biography ==
Barnes obtained three degrees in Physics: an AB from Hardin-Simmons University in 1933, an MS from Brown University under Robert Bruce Lindsay in 1936, and an honorary Sc.D. again from Hardin-Simmons University in 1950. His detractors have questioned his credentials based on the fact that his doctorate was honorary.

At the time that Barnes joined the Creation Research Society (CRS) in the early 1960s, he was the head of the Schellenger Research Laboratories at Texas Western College (now University of Texas at El Paso), where he was completing a textbook on electricity and magnetism, and on whose faculty he served from 1938 until he retired in 1981. Barnes headed one of the first projects of the CRS, to create a creationist high school biology text. Barnes served as the president of the CRS in the mid-1970s.

=== Earth's magnetic field decay ===
Barnes claimed to calculate the half-life of the Earth's magnetic field as approximately 1,400 years based on 130 years of empirical data. Some creationists have used Barnes' argument as evidence for a young Earth, less than 10,000 years as suggested by the Bible. His critics have challenged this concept, claiming that Barnes failed to take experimental uncertainties into account and used an obsolete model of the interior of the Earth.

== Works ==
=== Books ===
- Thomas G. Barnes, Science and Biblical Faith: A Science Documentary, Creation Research Society Books, 191pp. (1993) (ISBN 978-0963755001).
- Thomas G. Barnes, Space Medium: The Key to Unified Physics, Geo/Space Research Foundation, 170pp. (1986) (ISBN 978-0936961019).
- Thomas G. Barnes, Physics of the Future: A Classical Unification of Physics, Master Books, 208pp., (1983) (ISBN 978-0932766090).
- Thomas G. Barnes, Origin and Destiny of the Earth's Magnetic Field, Institute for Creation Research, (1973) (ISBN 978-0890510131).
- Thomas G. Barnes, Foundations of Electricity and Magnetism, Heath, 331pp., (1965) (ASIN B0006BMTRU).

=== Articles ===
- Thomas G. Barnes, "Resonant Optics for Detection of Rotation and Translation", Galilean Electrodynamics, V2, N3, p. 55 [Correspondence V2, N4, p. 77] (1991).
- Thomas G. Barnes & Harold S. Slusher, "Space Medium Theory Applied to Lunar and Stellar Aberration", Galilean Electrodynamics, V1, N4, p. 43 [Correspondence V1, N5, p. 68] (1990).
