= Coconut Island (Honolulu County) =

Island in Hawaiʻi, United States

Coordinates: 21°26′01″N 157°47′18″W

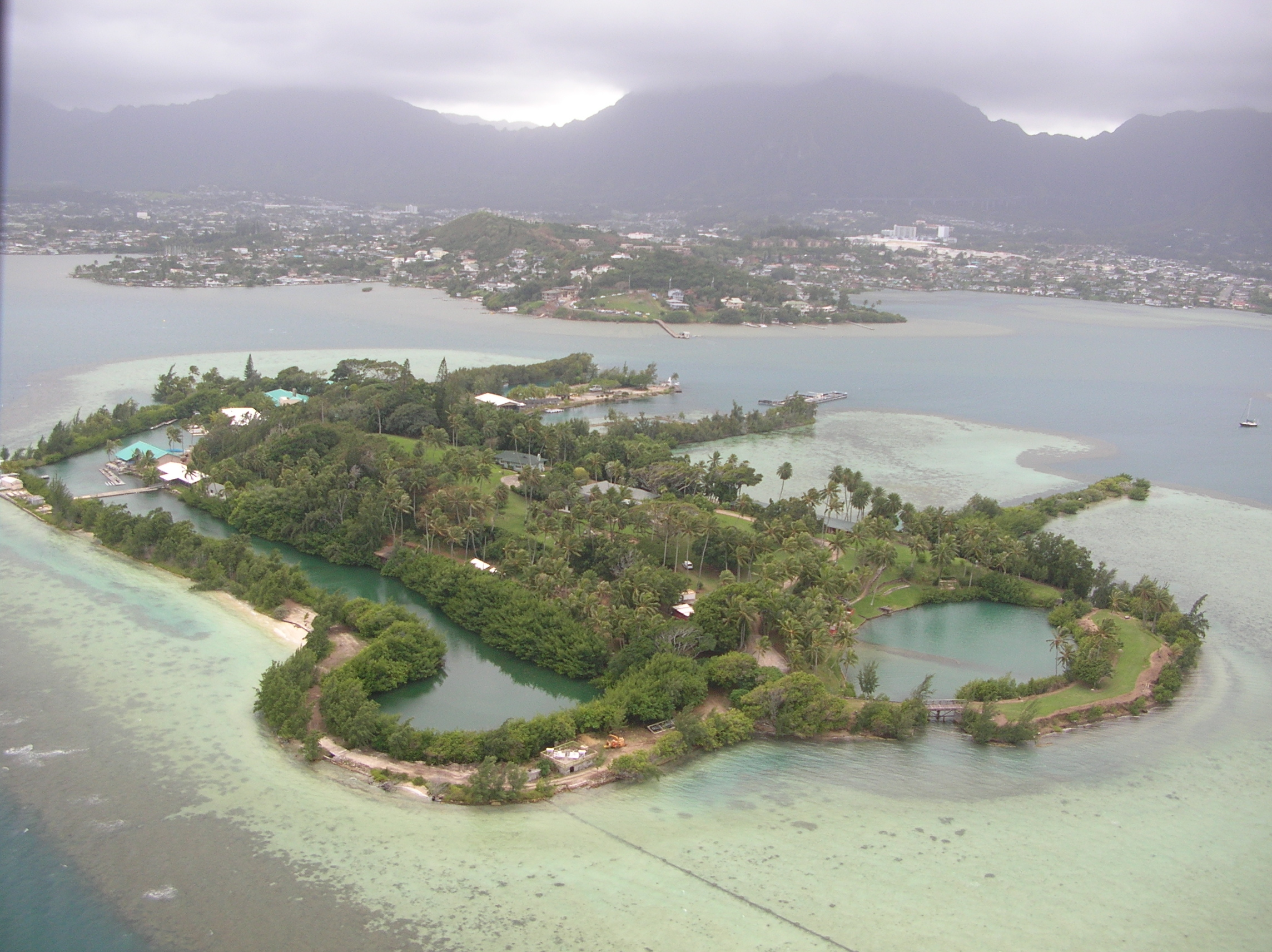
Coconut Isle in Kaneohe Bay

Coconut Island, or Moku o Loʻe, is a 28-acre (113,000 m^{2}) island in Kāneʻohe Bay off the island of Oʻahu in the state of Hawaiʻi, United States. It is a marine research facility of the Hawaiʻi Institute of Marine Biology (HIMB) of the University of Hawaiʻi.

== History ==
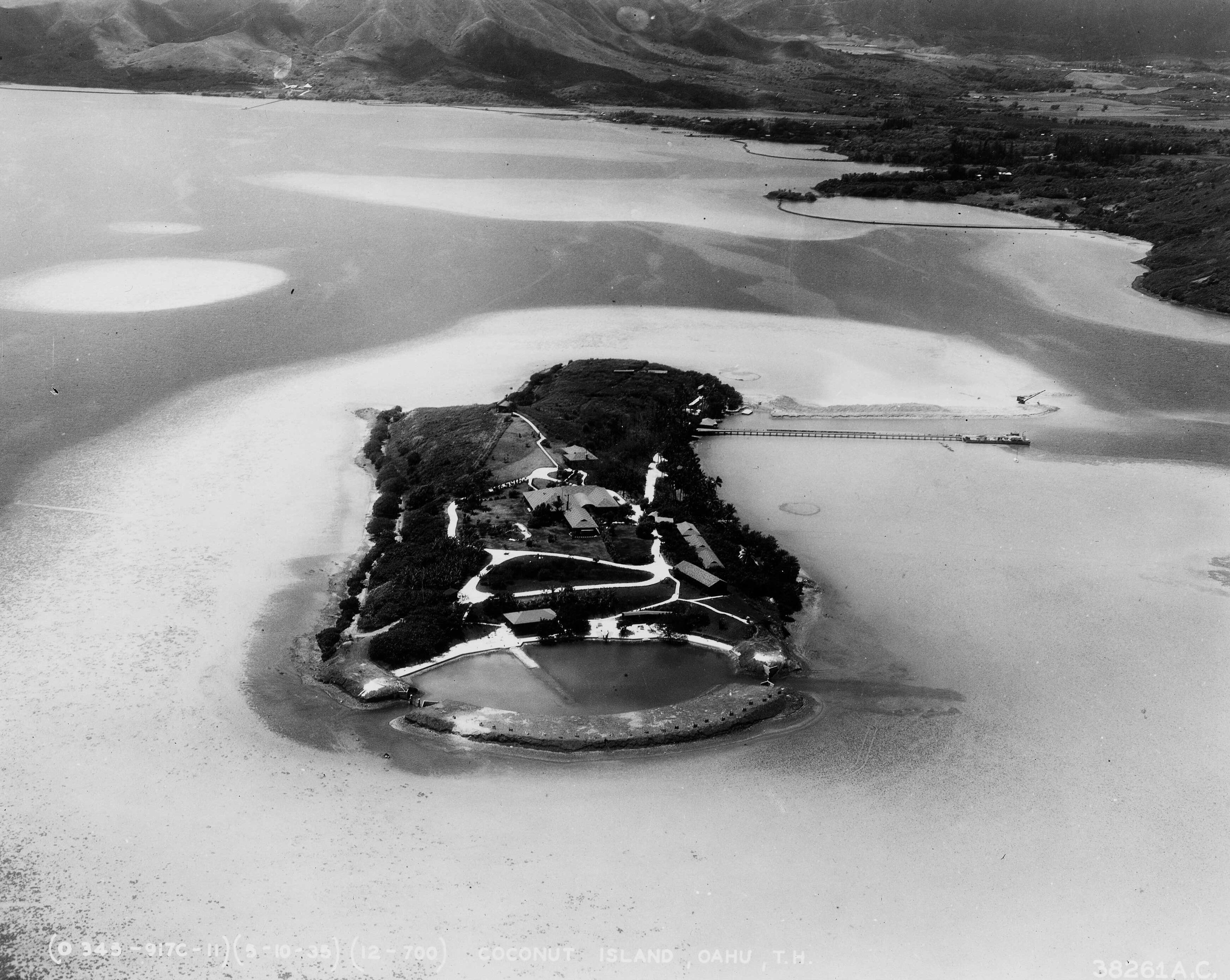
Coconut Island in 1935

In 1934–1936, Chris Holmes II, an heir to the Fleischmann yeast fortune, doubled the original 12-acre (49,000 m^{2}) island with coral rubble, sand, and earthen landfill. He established a residence with aquaria, kennels, and aviaries for his many pets. The island was converted to a rest and relaxation station for United States Navy flyers during World War II.

In 1946 a group of five Los Angeles businessmen, including Edwin W. Pauley, bought the island from the estate of Chris Holmes II with the idea of converting it to the exclusive Coconut Island Club International, 1946-7, and hired architects Paul Williams, A. Quincy Jones, and C.W. Lemmon of Belt Lemmon and Lo, Architects of Honolulu to design a community of cottages, tennis courts, a yacht club and other recreational facilities including remodeling the Holmes mansion and barracks. The Pauley group wanted to develop the island into a private, membership only resort. In 1949 this idea was dropped and a scaled-back Coconut Island Hotel with accommodation for 32 guests opened in February 1950.

In 1948, Pauley donated a portion of the island to the University of Hawaii to be used as a marine research facility. From the 1950s to the 1980s, the Pauley family used the island for summer get-aways and hosted many notable guests. From the mid-80s to mid-90s Japanese real estate investor Katsuhiro Kawaguchi (Note: Mr. Katsuhiro Kawaguchi (Japanese: 川口勝弘氏が; born 1933 or 1934) was owner of Hachidai Sangyo (Japanese: 八大産業). He was the first of the eight real estate investors involved in the 1980s Tokyo real estate bubble that burst in 1990. In 1984, Mr. Kawaguchi purchased the Central Apartment building in Harajuku (Japanese: 原宿セントラルアパート), which as of 18 April 2012 was rebuilt as the Tokyu Plaza at (4-30-3 Jingumae, Shibuya-ku, Tokyo (Japanese: 東京都渋谷区神宮前4-30-3)) Harajuku/Omotesando intersection, Jungumae intersection in Harajuku Shibuya Tokyo (Japanese: 原宿の東急プラザ). The Harajuku Central Apartment building was the center of the youth culture of the 1960s and 1970s in Tokyo and hosted numerous very influential rock concerts that were very popular after Elvis Presley (Japanese: アングラ). In April 1987, he sold the property and subsequently purchased Coconut Island for $8.3 million, which was approximately 1.2 billion yen at the time, on the day after the Hawaii state legislature had approved its acquiring the island for $8 million. In May 1987, Mr. Kawaguchi stated that he did not know that the state of Hawaii had approved its purchase of the island and stated that he would not let the state of Hawaii buyback his island. In May 1988, Mr. Kawaguchi was denied entry into the United States at the Honolulu International Airport because of an alleged visa violation.) owned the island and permitted the University of Hawaii to use some of its areas for research. In 1995, the Edwin Pauley Foundation granted a gift of $9.6 million to the University of Hawaii Foundation to purchase the private half of the island and build new laboratories on it.

The island is now completely owned by the state and is the facility for the Hawaiʻi Institute of Marine Biology, part of the University of Hawaiʻi. It is the only U.S. laboratory built on a coral reef. (Heron Island, Lizard Island and a number of labs in the South Pacific are located outside of the U.S.)

Coconut Island was used for the opening sequence of the television program Gilligan's Island.

Coconut island original name is Moku ‘o Lo’e which means island of Lo’e who was a lady that resided there in ancient times.

== See also ==
- Whitlow Au, researcher who worked on Coconut Island
