= Robert Bruce Lindsay =

American physicist and physics professor

- Born: January 1, 1900; New Bedford, Massachusetts, US
- Died: March 2, 1985 (aged 85); Newport, Rhode Island, US
- Education: Brown University; University of Copenhagen; Massachusetts Institute of Technology
- Known for: Acoustics; Philosophy of physics; Physics textbooks; 'Lindsay's Wheel of Acoustics'
- Awards: ASA Gold Medal (1962)
- Scientific career
- Fields: Physicist
- Workplaces: Yale University; Brown University
- Doctoral advisor: Niels Bohr; Hendrick A. Kramers; Henry B. Phillips
- Doctoral students: Thomas G. Barnes; Robert W. Morse; Raymond Seeger

Robert Bruce Lindsay (1 January 1900 – 2 March 1985) was an American physicist and academic, known as a prolific author of books on acoustics, and historical and philosophical analyses of physics.

== Biography ==
R(obert) Bruce Lindsay's January 1, 1900, birth date hailed the beginning of the last year of the 19th century. At the age of 20, he received both a BA and an MS in physics from Brown University. Before receiving his Ph.D. for atomic models of alkali metals from Massachusetts Institute of Technology in 1924, he spent the 1922–23 academic year as a Fellow of The American-Scandinavian Foundation at the University of Copenhagen under Niels Bohr and Hans Kramers. Lindsay and his wife Rachel translated Kramers’ book, The Atom and the Bohr Theory of its Structure, in 1923, receiving approximately $125, on which they toured Europe. Lindsay went to Yale University in 1923 as instructor in physics, and was promoted to assistant professor in 1927. He returned to Brown in 1930 as associate professor of theoretical physics, and was named Hazard Professor of Physics in 1936. He acted as chairman of the physics department at Brown from 1934 until he became dean of the graduate school in 1954. Lindsay received the ASA Gold Medal in 1962, before retiring as dean of the graduate school in 1966 and from teaching in 1970. He died March 2, 1985, in Newport, Rhode Island.

== Scientific contributions ==
A specialist in acoustics, particularly underwater sound, Lindsay’s career began in experimental physics, but eventually focused on the creation of thought-provoking physics books and courses. His innovative courses, such as “The Role of Science in Civilization” and “Energy and Man”, went beyond mere technical knowledge. Most of Lindsay's books were reprinted multiple times, and many remain in print. He is the namesake of the prestigious R. Bruce Lindsay Award, presented by the Acoustical Society of America since 1942.
