= William M. Hartmann =

American physicist

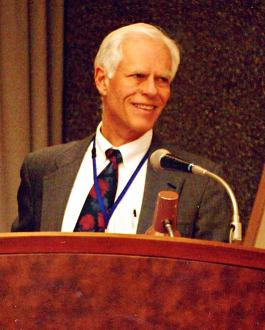
- William M. Hartmann
- Born: July 28, 1939 (age 87); Elgin, Illinois United States
- Education: Iowa State University; University of Oxford
- Scientific career
- Fields: Psychoacoustics, Condensed matter physics
- Workplaces: Michigan State University; University of Oxford
- Doctoral advisor: Roger Elliott

William M. Hartmann (born July 28, 1939) is a noted physicist, psychoacoustician, author, and former president of the Acoustical Society of America. His major contributions in psychoacoustics are in pitch perception, binaural hearing, and sound localization. Working with junior colleagues, he discovered several major pitch effects: the binaural edge pitch, the binaural coherence edge pitch, the pitch shifts of mistuned harmonics, and the harmonic unmasking effect. His textbook, Signals, Sound and Sensation, is widely used in courses on psychoacoustics. He is currently a professor of physics at Michigan State University.

Hartmann was born in Elgin, Illinois, USA on 28 July 1939. He studied electrical engineering and physics at Iowa State University in Ames, IA, (BSEE 1961). Supported by a Rhodes Scholarship (Iowa and Lincoln, 1961) he studied theoretical physics with Sir Roger Elliott at Oxford University in England (D.Phil. – condensed matter theory 1965). He continued research in condensed matter theory as a post-doctoral scholar at Argonne National Laboratory in Argonne Illinois (1965–1968).

In 1968 Dr. Hartmann joined the Department of Physics (now the Department of Physics and Astronomy) at Michigan State University in East Lansing where he is still employed as a professor of physics. His work in condensed matter theory primarily involved lattice vibrations (phonons) in defective crystals, where he was the first to show how to include short-range order among defects in the vibrational theory of alloys. Later, he studied the electron–phonon interaction in metals where he made the first calculation of the latent heats of melting metals.

In 1974 he began teaching an undergraduate course on musical acoustics which inspired his interest in human hearing. In 1976 he reinvented himself as a psychoacoustician, and he has continued to work in psychoacoustics, musical acoustics, and signal processing since that time. He has been an adjunct professor in the MSU Department of Psychology since 1979.

In 1981–82 Dr. Hartmann was a visiting scientist at the Institute for Research on Acoustics and Music (IRCAM) in Paris. He subsequently served at IRCAM as acting director of acoustics (1982–1983) and as consultant (1983–1987). He was an associate editor of Music Perception from 1988 to 1997, and he is currently the editor-in-chief of the Springer series Modern Acoustics and Signal Processing.

Dr. Hartmann's published work in psychoacoustics deals with pitch perception, signal detection, modulation detection and localization of sound. His pitch perception research is characterized by an unusual emphasis on tonotopically local effects such as pitch shifts, presumably originating in the auditory periphery. His sound localization research has emphasized signal confusions caused by room reflections and the strategies used by listeners to cope with them.

He has written one textbook, Signals, Sound, and Sensation (published by Springer-Verlag – AIP Press, 1997) and he was co-editor of the Springer Handbook of Acoustics (2007). He is the author of over 75 peer-reviewed journal articles. His patented (USPTO# 6,925,426) protocol for high-fidelity sound recording with uniquely realistic spatial characteristics became a New York Times science feature by James Glanz, November 16, 1999 "Recorded music gets dose of reality".

In 2001 Dr. Hartmann received the Distinguished Faculty Award from Michigan State University and the Interdisciplinary (Helmholtz–Rayleigh) ASA Silver Medal from the Acoustical Society of America. He later received the ASA Gold Medal in 2017 "for contributions to research and education in psychological acoustics and service to the society".

Dr. Hartmann has been a fellow of the Acoustical Society of America since 1983. He was chairman of the Technical Committee on Musical Acoustics and a member of the Society's Executive Council. He gave the Society Tutorial at the spring meeting in 1996 entitled, "Pitch, Periodicity and the Brain". He served as vice president of the Society (1998–1999) and as president (2001–2002). As president, he worked to enhance the Society's connections with allied organizations such as the Institute for Noise Control Engineering, and to expand the Society's international presence.
