= JASA Express Letters =

Scientific journal

- Discipline: Acoustics
- Language: English
- Edited by: Charles C. Church

Publication details
- History: 2021–present
- Publisher: American Institute of Physics on behalf of the Acoustical Society of America (United States)
- Frequency: Monthly
- Open access: Yes
- Impact factor: 1.5 (2025)

Standard abbreviations
- ISO 4: JASA Express Lett.

Indexing
- CODEN: JELAAE
- ISSN: 2691-1191

Links
- Journal homepage; Online archive

JASA Express Letters is a peer-reviewed and open access scientific journal published monthly by American Institute of Physics on behalf of the Acoustical Society of America. Established in 2021, it focuses on rapid communications on acoustics. From 2006 to 2020, it was published as a special section of the Journal of the Acoustical Society of America. Its current editor-in-chief is Charles C. Church (University of Mississippi).

== Abstracting and indexing ==
The journal is abstracted and indexed in:

- Directory of Open Access Journals
- EBSCO databases
- Ei Compendex
- Emerging Sources Citation Index
- Inspec
- MEDLINE
- Scopus

According to the Journal Citation Reports, the journal has a 2025 impact factor of 1.5.
