= Phonon drag =

Phonon drag is an increase in the effective mass of conduction electrons or valence holes due to interactions with the crystal lattice in which the electron moves. As an electron moves past atoms in the lattice its charge distorts or polarizes the nearby lattice. This effect leads to a decrease in the electron (or hole, as may be the case) mobility, which results in a decreased conductivity. However, as the magnitude of the Seebeck coefficient increases with phonon drag, it may be beneficial in a thermoelectric material for direct energy conversion applications. The magnitude of this effect is typically appreciable only at low temperatures (<200 K). Phonons are not always in local thermal equilibrium; they move against the thermal gradient. They lose momentum by interacting with electrons (or other carriers) and imperfections in the crystal. If the phonon-electron interaction is predominant, the phonons will tend to push the electrons to one end of the material, losing momentum in the process. This contributes to the already present thermoelectric field. This contribution is most important in the temperature region where phonon-electron scattering is predominant. This happens for

$$T \approx {1 \over 5} \theta_\mathrm{D}$$

where θ_{D} is the Debye temperature. At lower temperatures there are fewer phonons available for drag, and at higher temperatures they tend to lose momentum in phonon-phonon scattering instead of phonon-electron scattering.

This region of the Seebeck coefficient-versus-temperature function is highly variable under a magnetic field.
