= Hawaiʻi Institute of Marine Biology =

US research laboratory

Coordinates: 21.4327°N 157.7877°W

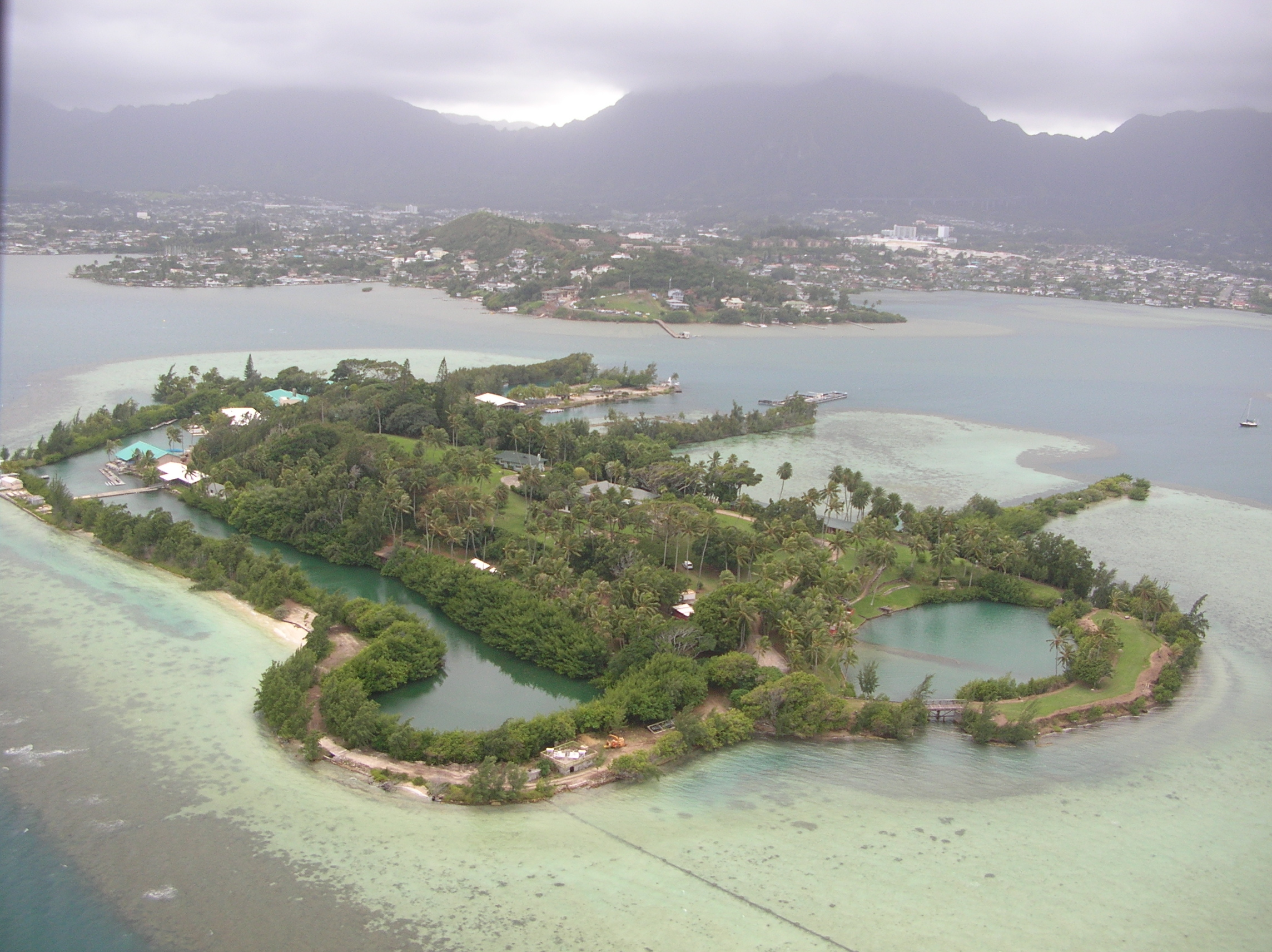
Hawaiʻi Institute of Marine Biology, located on Coconut Island in Kāneʻohe Bay

The Hawaiʻi Institute of Marine Biology (HIMB) is a marine biology laboratory located on the state-owned Coconut Island in Kāneʻohe Bay.

== History ==
The institute was established in 1912. It began as a wooden structure on the shores of Waikiki and originally functioned in conjunction with the Waikiki Aquarium until 1919 when both operations became part of the University of Hawai‘i. In 1947 a group of wealthy oil tycoons, including Edwin W. Pauley, bought Coconut Island. Pauley donated a part of the island to the university for use as a marine laboratory for the study of the marine sciences. In 1993, the Pauley family donated the remaining private part of Coconut Island for the construction of a world-class marine laboratory.

In 2008, the institute was seeking 57 million dollars through state-issued bonds for the construction of a 24,000-square-foot (2,200 m^{2}) marine research facility. The site is on the southeast side of the island. This is part of the master plan approved by the University of Hawaii's Board of Regents in 1998, which includes the addition of several research buildings, laboratories, and conference facilities. These will be funded on a case-by-case basis. The intent is to turn Coconut Island into the world's premier coral reef research facility.

== Geography ==
Coconut Island is approximately 29 acres (120,000 m^{2}), including 6 acres (24,000 m^{2}) of enclosed lagoons used to keep organisms being studied in captivity. Surrounding it are 64 acres (260,000 m^{2}) of coral reef, designated by the state of Hawai‘i as the Hawai‘i Marine Laboratory Refuge. It is part of the University of Hawaii at Manoa. It is the only research facility in the world built on a coral reef.

The boundaries of the Hawaii Marine Laboratory Refuge surrounding the island start at the high-water mark on the island and go to twenty-five feet beyond the outer edges of the reefs, including sand and seawall shoreline, where coral and sand calcium carbonate reef flats are exposed at low tides. High coral and macro-algae flourish at shallow-depth zones while the deep habitats are characterized by sediment with low coral cover and colonized by slumping from upper reef zones. Within Kaneohe Bay are sheltered areas. Man-made impacts in the area include dredging, sewage release and freshwater flooding. The shores of the bay are characterized by coastal development.

== Habitat ==
The HIMB research facilities are used to explore deep-sea habitats where new species may be discovered and documented, as well as shallow reefs which are rich habitats likely to contain undiscovered species.

== Programs ==
Hawai‘i Coral Reef Assessment and Monitoring Program (CRAMP) is located at HIMB. It established a statewide network of more than 30 long-term coral reef monitoring sites with associated data collection systems. It went on to include rapid quantitative research and habitat mapping, which are tools new used to understand the ecology of the Hawaiian coral reefs in relation to surrounding geographic areas.

One study of the HIMB research projects is on the effects of sound on dolphins. Another is the study of chemicals in Enchanted Lake.

In 2015, the institute was testing a new form of coral resistant to coral bleaching. The institute also spoke publicly to argue in favor of banning sunscreens with chemicals, as they majorly contribute to coral bleaching.

== See also ==
- Hawaiian Islands Humpback Whale National Marine Sanctuary
- Hawaii Marine Laboratory Refuge
