= Journal of the Acoustical Society of America =

Scientific journal

- Discipline: Acoustics
- Language: English
- Edited by: James F. Lynch

Publication details
- History: 1929–present
- Publisher: American Institute of Physics on behalf of the Acoustical Society of America (United States)
- Frequency: Monthly
- Impact factor: 2.3 (2024)

Standard abbreviations
- ISO 4: J. Acoust. Soc. Am.

Indexing
- CODEN: JASMAN
- ISSN: 0001-4966
- LCCN: sn98038156
- OCLC no.: 224453498

Links
- Journal homepage; Online archive

The Journal of the Acoustical Society of America (JASA) is a monthly peer-reviewed scientific journal covering all aspects of acoustics. It is published by the American Institute of Physics on behalf of Acoustical Society of America. The editor-in-chief is James F. Lynch (Woods Hole Oceanographic Institution).

JASA contains news items, book reviews, references to contemporary papers, reviews of acoustical patents, and standards news.

== History ==
In 1929, the newly formed Acoustical Society of America Publication Committee began investigating how to start a journal. The first issue of the Journal of the Acoustical Society of America (JASA) was published in October 1929 and contained 8 papers. The cover featured the 1929 logo designed by Wallace Waterfall. In May 1932, publication of JASA was transferred to the American Institute of Physics (AIP). In 1957 the publication frequency of the journal went from bimonthly to monthly. In the early 1990s JASA began accepting and publishing papers online and in 1994, began issuing past volumes of JASA on CD-ROM. In 1999, the ASA president, Robert Apfel, initiated the journal Acoustics Research Letters Online (ARLO) which was eventually renamed JASA Express Letters and included as a section of JASA from 2006 to 2020. JASA Express Letters became an independent journal in 2021.

== Abstracting and indexing ==
The journal is abstracted and indexed in:

- Biological Abstracts
- BIOSIS Previews
- Current Contents/Engineering, Computing & Technology
- Current Contents/Life Sciences
- EBSCO databases
- Ei Compendex
- Inspec
- MEDLINE
- Science Citation Index Expanded
- Scopus
- zbMATH Open
- The Zoological Record

According to the Journal Citation Reports, the journal has a 2024 impact factor of 2.3.
