= Acoustical Society of America =

International scientific society

- Logo since April 2, 2018
- Formation: 1929
- Type: Professional association
- President: Ann Bradlow
- Vice President: Carol Espy-Wilson
- Website: Official website

The Acoustical Society of America (abbreviated ASA) is an international scientific society founded in 1929 dedicated to generating, disseminating and promoting the knowledge of acoustics and its practical applications. The Society is primarily a voluntary organization of about 7500 members and attracts the interest, commitment, and service of many professionals.

== History ==
In the summer of 1928, Floyd R. Watson and Wallace Waterfall (1900–1974), a former doctoral student of Watson, were invited by UCLA's Vern Oliver Knudsen to an evening dinner at Knudsen's beach club in Santa Monica. The three physicists decided to form a society of acoustical engineers interested in architectural acoustics. In the early part of December 1928, Wallace Waterfall sent letters to sixteen people inquiring about the possibility of organizing such a society. Harvey Fletcher offered the use of the Bell Telephone Laboratories at 463 West Street in Manhattan as a meeting place for an organizational, initial meeting to be held on December 27, 1928. The meeting was attended by forty scientists and engineers who started the Acoustical Society of America (ASA). Temporary officers were elected: Harvey Fletcher as president, V. O. Knudsen as vice-president, Wallace Waterfall as secretary, and Charles Fuller Stoddard (1876–1958) as treasurer. A constitution and by-laws were drafted. The first issue of the Journal of the Acoustical Society of America was published in October 1929.

=== Founding members ===
The first meeting was attended by forty scientists and engineers who started the Acoustical Society of America (ASA). Some of those members include:

- Edward Joseph Schroeter
- Harvey Fletcher
- Floyd K. Richtmyer
- Dayton Miller
- Harold D. Arnold
- Frederick Albert Saunders
- Floyd R. Watson
- Irving Wolff

== Technical committees ==
The Society has 13 technical committees that represent specialized interests in the field of acoustics. The committees organize technical sessions at conferences and are responsible for the representation of their sub-field in ASA publications. The committees include:

- Acoustical oceanography
- Animal bioacoustics
- Architectural acoustics
- Biomedical acoustics
- Computational acoustics (Technical Specialty Group)
- Acoustical engineering
- Musical acoustics
- Noise
- Physical acoustics
- Psychoacoustics
- Signal processing in acoustics
- Speech communication
- Structural acoustics and vibration
- Underwater acoustics

== Publications ==
The Acoustical Society of America publishes a wide variety of material related to the knowledge and practical application of acoustics in physics, engineering, architecture, noise, oceanography, biology, speech and hearing, psychology and music.

- The Journal of the Acoustical Society of America (JASA) — founded in 1929, this is a peer-reviewed academic journal operating on the traditional subscription model.
- JASA Express Letters (2021–present) online archive — this is a peer-reviewed academic journal operating on the open access model.
- Proceedings of Meetings on Acoustics (POMA) (2007–present) online archive — repository for their conference proceedings.
- Acoustics Today (2005–present) online archive — a general interest magazine on acoustics.

In 2021, the ASA Publications' Office began producing Across Acoustics, a podcast to highlight authors' research from these four publications.

=== Discontinued publications ===
- Echoes (1991-2013) online archive — Quarterly newsletter.
- Acoustics Research Letters Online (2000-2005) online archive — Launched as an open access journal. It became a section of the Journal of the Acoustical Society of America from 2006 to 2020, then in 2021 became the current journal JASA Express Letters.
- Noise Control (1955-1961) online archive
- Sound: Its Uses and Control (1962-1963) online archive — A continuation of Noise Control, with broadened scope.

== Meetings ==
Acoustical Society of America
- Genre: Acoustics conference
- Frequency: Twice a year
- Organiser: Acoustical Society of America

The ASA hosts meetings twice a year, typically somewhere in North America. In the last few decades, the ASA has hosted joint meetings with other acoustical societies, such as the 137th meeting in 1999, which took place in Berlin and was hosted with the European Acoustics Association (EAA) and the de:German Society for Acoustics (DAGA). The total number of presentations at each meeting is between 850 and 1100. The Proceedings of Meetings on Acoustics (POMA) have been published after these meetings since 2007. As of 2026, ASA has hosted nearly 200 meetings on acoustics.

== Awards ==
The ASA presents awards and prizes to individuals for contributions to the field of acoustics. The annual awards are the ASA Gold Medal, the R. Bruce Lindsay Award, and the A.B. Wood Medal and Prize. The remainder are awarded when relevant. Most technical committees also sponsor awards for best student or early career presenter at each conference.

=== List of awards ===
- Gold Medal — for general contributions to the field.
- Silver Medal
  - Interdisciplinary Silver Medal – Helmholtz-Rayleigh Interdisciplinary Silver Medal
- R. Bruce Lindsay Award — to outstanding members of the ASA and their contributions.
- Wallace Clement Sabine Medal — for contributions to architectural acoustics.
- Pioneers of Underwater Acoustics Medal — for contributions to underwater acoustics.
- A. B. Wood Medal and Prize of the Institute of Acoustics — for those 40 or under who have made significant contributions to acoustics.
- Trent-Crede Medal — for contributions to the science of mechanical vibration and shock.
- von Békésy Medal — for contributions to psychological and physiological acoustics
- Honorary Fellows
- Distinguished Service Citation
- Science Communication Award
- Rossing Prize in Acoustics Education
- David T. Blackstock Mentor Award
- Medwin Prize in Acoustical Oceanography
- William and Christine Hartmann Prize in Auditory Neuroscience

== Student activity ==
The ASA offers membership and conference attendance to students at a substantially reduced rate. Conference attendance is further promoted by travel subsidies and formal and informal student meetings and social activities. The ASA also expanded services to students in 2004 by introducing regional student chapters.
