= Laszlo Adler =

American physicist

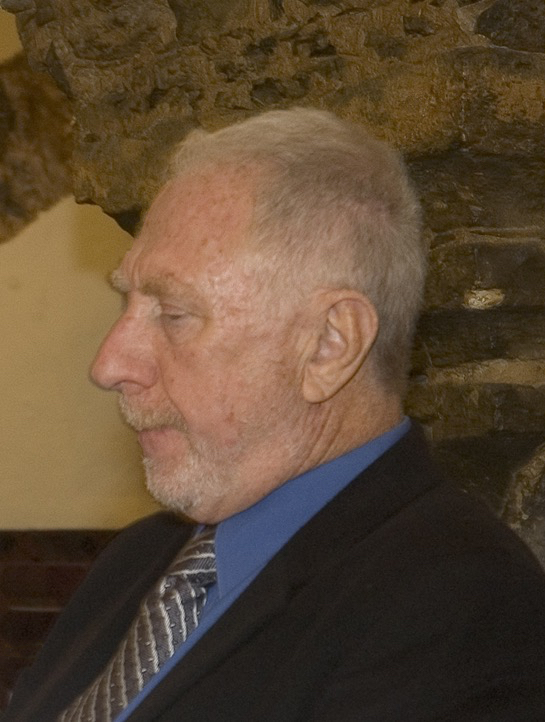
- Laszlo Adler in 2005
- Born: December 3, 1932 (age 93); Debrecen, Kingdom of Hungary
- Citizenship: American (1963–)
- Education: Eötvös Loránd University, BS Physics and Mathematics, 1956; Michigan State University, MS Physics, 1961; University of Tennessee, PhD Physics, 1969
- Known for: Nondestructive Evaluation of Materials
- Spouse: Vera Princz Adler (m. 1963)
- Children: 2
- Awards: Ohio State University Distinguished Scholar Award, 1993; Taine McDougal Professorship, 1989; University of Tennessee Distinguished Alumni Award, 2017; ICU Golden Whistle Award, 2025
- Scientific career
- Fields: Physics
- Workplaces: General Motors Institute; University of Gottingen; University of Tennessee; Ohio State University; Oak Ridge National Laboratory; University of Paris VII; Israel Institute of Metals Technion; Air Force Materials Research Laboratory
- Thesis: Parametric generation of ultrasonic waves : linear and nonlinear phenomena (1969)
- Doctoral advisor: Mack A. Breazeale

Laszlo Adler is a Hungarian born, Hungarian-American physicist and a Taine McDougal Professor Emeritus in the Department of Integrated Systems Engineering at the Ohio State University. He is known for his work in Ultrasonics, Acousto-optics, and Nondestructive Evaluation of Materials. He is a holocaust survivor and has been active in scientific research for over 60 years.

== Early life and education ==
Adler was born in Debrecen, Kingdom of Hungary (present-day, Hungary) on December 3, 1932, and became a Naturalized United States citizen in Flint, Michigan, in 1963. He received his BS in Physics and Mathematics from Eötvös Loránd University in Budapest, Hungary, in 1956 and his MS in physics, under Egon A. Hiedeman, from Michigan State University in 1961. In 1969, he obtained a PhD in physics, under Mack A. Breazeale, from the University of Tennessee.

== Career ==
From 1960 until 1964, Adler was an assistant professor at General Motors Institute in Flint, Michigan. At the University of Göttingen, he was a National Science Foundation Faculty Fellow from 1964 until 1965. He became an instructor at the University of Tennessee in 1966, where he remained until 1980 and left as an associate professor to become a full professor at the Ohio State University in 1980. As a faculty member at the University of Tennessee, he was the director of the Nondestructive Evaluation Division, the first such division in the United States, in Knoxville from 1978 until 1980. He became a visiting professor at the University of Paris VII in France in 1979 (a position he kept until 1997). He was an adjunct research participant in the Metals and Ceramics Division of Oak Ridge National Laboratory and a visiting scientist at the Air Force Materials Research Laboratory in Dayton, Ohio. While a professor at the Ohio State University, he served as the director of the Nondestructive Evaluation Program from 1980 until 1995 and was a Taine McDougal Professor from 1989 until 1995. In 1975 he was a guest lecturer at the Israel Institute of Metals Technion. In 1982, 1985, 1988, and 1991, he served as a guest lecturer at the International School of Acoustics in Erice, Sicily. In 1987 he was a guest lecturer at the National Taiwan University. He guest-lectured at the University of Paris VII in 1980, 1984, 1988, and 1992. He serves as a technical committee member in Physical acoustics of the Acoustical Society of America and has been an editorial board member of Springer's Journal of Nondestructive Evaluation since 1979. He also contributed to several organizing committees of international congresses, and he was an organizer or co-organizer of congresses in the United States, Canada, Germany, Great Britain, and France. Laszlo Adler holds four patents and is President of Adler Consultants Inc.

== Honors and awards ==
He received the University Distinguished Scholar Award from the Ohio State University in 1993 and the Taine McDougal Professorship in 1989. Exquisite Research grants were also awarded, such as the Ohio State University College of Engineering Lumley Research Award in 1992, the Ohio State University Distinguished Research Professor Award in 1984 and 1992, and the National Science Foundation Faculty Fellowship in 1964. In 2017, he was awarded the University of Tennessee Distinguished Alumni Award. In 2025, he received the Golden Whistle Award (The ICU's Lifetime Achievement Award) from the Board of the International Congress on Ultrasonics.

== Scientific research and academia ==
His early research was in nonlinear Acousto-optics during which he developed the first acousto-optical method to evaluate the nonlinearity parameter B/A in liquids. He also did pioneering work in bone elasticity characterization using ultrasound. When he commenced working at Oak Ridge National Laboratory, where he would remain active for 30 years, he began to study nondestructive evaluation of materials. He developed, for instance, a method based on ultrasonic spectroscopy. He also developed ultrasound techniques relevant to Nondestructive Evaluation (NDE) in the nuclear industry, such as steel welds and surface residual stress measurements. Adler was also a participant from the beginning of the nationwide interdisciplinary program 'Quantitative Nondestructive Evaluation – QNDE' from the early 1970s onward. At the University of Tennessee, he worked on Acousto-optics, Nonlinear Acoustics, Ultrasonic Nondestructive Evaluation and Material Characterization, and Medical and biological ultrasonics. During his sabbatical stay in Israel in 1975, he initiated ultrasonic measurements on composite materials and organized one of the first NDE symposia in the country. In 1980, he organized the Ultrasonic Evaluation Conference in Paris with Gerard Quentin, the first congress in a series that would last 20 years. During his research in Paris, Adler added ultrasound measurements of Biot solids to his portfolio. When he joined the Ohio State University in 1980, he was responsible for developing the Graduate Program in Nondestructive Evaluation in the College of Engineering, the first in the United States to offer MS and PhD degrees in Nondestructive Evaluation in various areas in ultrasonics. For instance, the Canadian Air Force selected the program to train their officers between 1981 and 1994. After 1995, Adler received substantial research support from NASA and NAVAIR to develop angle beam ultrasonic spectroscopy. In 2010, he established with John Cantrell and Tom Yost a research program at NASA Langley Research Center to study nonlinear ultrasonic effects in fluids based on ultrasonic spectroscopy and laser detection, and it included the application of subharmonics in a liquid-filled cavity and chaos for increasing ultrasonic amplitudes. Since 2010, Adler has continued scientific activity and made, on average, one congress presentation annually, a remarkable achievement given his age.

== Scientists influenced ==
As a research scientist in 1978, Dale Chimenti was introduced to Leaky Rayleigh wave and leaky Lamb wave measurement techniques and applied the techniques throughout his career. Stanislas Rokhlin was introduced to NDE by Laszlo Adler at the Ohio State University. Peter B. Nagy was introduced to NDE by Laszlo Adler at the Ohio State University. Nico F. Declercq, a PhD student in 2004, was introduced by Adler to viscous damping effects in liquids and their effects on leaky Lamb waves during a visit to Japan in 2004. Laszlo Adler would also serve as a PhD committee member in 2005 and played a key role, with Mack A. Breazeale, in Declercq's decision in 2006 to pursue an academic career in the United States.

== Collaborating scientists ==
Gerard Quentin, Alain Jungman, Michel de Billy, Marilyn Talmant, and Christophe Mattei, through different types of funding, including NATO, NSF, and CNRS. Jan D. Achenbach, Stanislas Rokhlin, Peter Nagy, Robert A. Roberts, Jim Rose, Jean-François Amphoux de Belleval, Oswald Leroy, Katrien Mampaert, Peter Doyle, through the inviting and well-equipped laboratory facilities installed within the graduate program developed by Adler at the Ohio State University. Also, Robert L Crane, and Dale Chimenti through AFWAL Materials Laboratory

== Scientific publications ==
Laszlo Adler published two books in his research field and 13 book chapters. He published his first journal paper in 1962 and has, in 60 years of scientific activity, published 258 articles in peer-reviewed journals and congress proceedings. Among a significant variety of publications, Laszlo Adler's work was primarily focussing on the following topics: Nonlinear acousto-optics and measurements of the nonlinearity parameter M/A in liquids; theoretical and experimental development of subharmonics generations and the parametric resonance model; ultrasonic spectroscopy, and the geometrical diffraction theory for elastic waves; nonlinear Bragg diffraction imaging and discontinuity evaluation; leaky Rayleigh waves at liquid-solid and air-solid interfaces and the modification of Brekhovskikh and also Bertoni and Tamir theories; leaky Rayleigh waves in layered materials; ultrasonic surface waves to evaluate residual stresses on welded pipes; ultrasonic evaluation of anisotropic elastic constants of textured materials such as welds and casts; surface and bulk ultrasonic waves to evaluate elastic constants of human and animal bones and the detection of fractures; ultrasonic spectroscopy to study periodically rough interfaces; ultrasonic imaging of bubbles in liquids for safety in the nuclear industry; ultrasonic diffraction caustics for flaw characterization; ultrasonic scattering to evacuate porosity in casts and welds; ultrasonic surface and Lamb wave studies of Biot solids, i.e., solids with fluid-filled discontinuities; scanning acoustic microscopy (SAM) to study grain structures and the role of surface waves; higher order nonlinearities in thin adhesive layers; ultrasonic evaluation of friction welded layered structures; angle beam ultrasonic spectroscopy to evaluate adhesive bonds in metals and composites; and ultrasonic harmonics and subharmonics leading to chaos in a liquid filled cavity.

== Family ==
Adler, the son of Miklos and Ilona Adler married Vera Princz in Toronto, Canada, in 1963. They live in Florida and have two children. Vera is, like Adler, a holocaust survivor. Adler had just started elementary school when Nazi Germany invaded Poland in 1939. He lived with his family in Jewish-hostile Hungary until the German invasion in 1944. In about three weeks of occupation, he was moved into the Ghetto of Debrecen. A few weeks later, he was sent to a concentration camp called 'the brick factory' and, from there, to a labor camp, Strasshof, near Vienna. In April 1945, the Germans sent the family to an extermination camp, but the railway station was bombed by Russian planes, which stopped the deportation. They were liberated a few weeks later by the Russian Army.

== Bibliography ==
- Ultrasonic Spectral Analysis for Nondestructive Evaluation, (D.W. Fitting and L.Adler), (Plenum Press, New York, 1981).
- "Ultrasonic Frequency Analysis" (K.V. Cook, W.A. Simpson, and L. Adler), Chapter 1, Research Techniques in Nondestructive Testing, Vol. 3, ed. R.S. Sharpe, (Academic Press, London, 1977), pp. 1–49.
- "Ultrasonic leaky waves in the presence of a thin layer" (A. H. Nayfeh, D. E. Chimenti, Laszlo Adler, R. L. Crane), Journal of Applied Physics Vol. 52 Issue 8, (August 1981), pp. 4985-4994.
- "Caustics and the Inversion of Ultrasonic Scattering Data" (P.A. Doyle, J. Latimer, and L. Adler), Chapter 4, Research Techniques in Nondestructive Testing, Vol. 5, ed. R.S. Sharpe, (Academic Press, London, 1982), pp. 98–129.
- "An Overview of Ultrasonic Spectroscopy Applied to Nondestructive Material Evaluation," (D. Fitting and L. Adler), Chapter 10, Elastic Wave Scattering and Propagation, eds. V.K. Varadan and V.V.Varadan, (Ann Arbor Science Publications, 1982), pp. 177–196.
- "In-Process Ultrasonic Nondestructive Evaluation," (S.I. Rokhlin and L. Adler), Chapter in Non-Destructive Material Property Characteristics, ed. J.F. Bussiere, (Plenum Press, New York, 1987), pp. 19–27.
- "Polar Characteristics of the Group and Phase Velocities, as well as the Frequency Dependence, of Lamb Waves in Graphite/Epoxy Composites," (W. Rose, S.I. Rokhlin, P.B. Nagy, and L. Adler), Chapter in Non-Destructive Material Property Characteristics, ed. J.F. Bussiere, (Plenum Press, New York, 1987), pp. 61–68.
- "Spatial Averaging in Porosity Assessment by Ultrasonic Attenuation Spectroscopy," (P.B. Nagy, D.V. Rypien, and L. Adler), Chapter in Non-Destructive Material Property Characteristics, ed. J.F. Bussiere, (Plenum Press, New York, 1987), pp. 683–685.
- "Composite Characterization Using Generalized Lamb Waves," (L. Adler), Book on Physical Acoustics, International School of Physical Acoustics 1988 Meeting, (JBW Printers & Binders, Singapore, 1989), pp. 141–166.
- "Waveform and Data Analysis Technique,"(L. Adler, A. Jungman, P.B. Nagy, and J. Rose) Chapter in Nondestructive Testing Handbook, (American Society for Nondestructive Testing,1991) pp. 132–185
- "Material Characterization by Ultrasonic Spectroscopy," Chapter in Acoustic Sensing and Probing, ed. A. Alippi, (World Scientific Publishing, Singapore, 1992), pp. 3–20.
- "Ultrasonic Spectroscopy," (L. Adler), Chapter in Evaluation of Materials and Structures by Quantitative Ultrasonics, ed. J.D. Achenbach, (Springer-Verlag, New York, 1993), pp. 25–41.
- "Flaw Characterization by Ultrasonic Spectrum Analysis," (L. Adler), Chapter in Evaluation of Materials and Structures by Quantitative Ultrasonics, ed. J.D. Achenbach, (Springer-Verlag, New York, 1993), pp. 57–69.
- "Spectroscopic Evaluation of Layered Substrates," (L. Adler), Chapter in Evaluation of Materials and Structures by Quantitative Ultrasonics, ed. J.D. Achenbach, (Springer-Verlag, New York, 1993), pp. 133–147.
- "Characterization of Porous Materials by Ultrasonic Spectroscopy," (L. Adler), Chapter in Evaluation of Materials and Structures by Quantitative Ultrasonics, ed. J.D. Achenbach, (Springer-Verlag, New York, 1993), pp. 161–173.
- "Resonance, my journey beyond ultrasound" (L. Adler), Amazon publishing co. (2015)
