= ASA Silver Medal =

The ASA Silver Medal is an award presented by the Acoustical Society of America to individuals, without age limitation, for contributions to the advancement of science, engineering, or human welfare through the application of acoustic principles or through research accomplishments in acoustics. The medal is awarded in a number of categories depending on the technical committee responsible for making the nomination.

Recipients of the medal are listed below.

== Silver Medal ==
Source: Acoustical Society of America

=== Silver Medal in Acoustical Oceanography ===
- 1993 – Clarence S. Clay – for contributions to understanding acoustic propagation in layered waveguides, scattering from the ocean's boundaries and marine life, and ocean parameters and processes.
- 1997 – Herman Medwin – for contributions to the understanding of acoustical scattering, absorption and ambient noise, particularly in relation to the acoustics of bubbles in the sea.
- 2004 – D. Vance Holliday – for contributions to the study of marine life, from plankton to whales.
- 2009 – Robert C. Spindel – for implementation of ocean acoustic tomography and basin scale acoustic thermometry.
- 2017 – Michael J. Buckingham – for contributions to the understanding of ocean ambient noise and marine sediment acoustics.

=== Silver Medal in Animal Bioacoustics ===
- 1998 – Whitlow W.L. Au – for contributions to the fundamental knowledge of the acoustics of dolphin sonar.
- 2005 – James A. Simmons – for contributions to understanding bat echolocation.
- 2012 – Richard R. Fay – for pioneering research on hearing in fish.
- 2021 – Peter M. Narins – for contributions to the sound production, hearing and neuroethology of anuran amphibians.

=== Silver Medal in Architectural Acoustics ===
- 1976 – Theodore J. Schultz – for significant contributions to the understanding of acoustical design parameters and criteria for concert halls and other music performance spaces.

=== Silver Medal in Biomedical Acoustics ===
- 2013 – Kullervo H. Hynynen – for contributions to the science and the clinical applications of therapeutic ultrasound.
- 2021 – William D. O’Brien – for contributions to ultrasound bioeffects, dosimetry, and quantitative tissue characterization.

=== Silver Medal in Biomedical Ultrasound/Bioresponse to Vibration ===
- 1999 – Ronald T. Verrillo – for contributions to the psychophysics and physiology of vibrotactile sensitivity.
- 2004 – James G. Miller – for contributions to ultrasonic tissue characterization and quantitative echocardiography.

=== Silver Medal in Bioresponse to Vibration ===
- 1989 – Floyd Dunn – for contributions to the understanding of the interactions of ultrasound with biological media.

=== Silver Medal in Engineering Acoustics ===
- 1974 – Harry F. Olson – for his innovative and lasting contributions in microphones, loudspeakers, sound reproduction, and electronic music, his many publications, and his constructive editing.
- 1976 – Hugh S. Knowles – for leadership, innovation, vision in the application of acoustical science and technology in industry and government and, in particular, for contributions to the advancement of technology for hearing improvement.
- 1978 – Benjamin B. Bauer – for his contributions to engineering acoustics, particularly in the development of techniques and devices used to pick up, record, and reproduce sound.
- 1982 – Per Vilhelm Bruel – for significant contributions in sound level instrumentation and precision measurement, and for notable leadership in international standards in acoustics.
- 1984 – Vincent Salmon – for contributions in the design of horns and the control of noise and vibration.
- 1986 – Albert G. Bodine – for his ingenuity in developing sonic vibratory devices of great technological importance.
- 1989 – Joshua E. Greenspon – for his leadership and contributions to the solution of underwater radiation and scattering problems.
- 1992 – Alan Powell – for leadership in research in the silencing of ship noise and for fundamental contributions to aeroacoustics.
- 1995 – James E. West – for developing and optimizing polymer electret transducers.
- 1998 – Richard H. Lyon – for contributions to noise reduction and products through design and to Statistical Energy Analysis.
- 2001 – Ilene Busch-Vishniac – for development of novel electret microphones and of micro-electro-mechanical sensors and positioners.
- 2004 – John V. Bouyoucos – for the invention and development of hydraulically powered acoustic amplifiers for underwater use.
- 2012 – Gary W. Elko – for application of digital signal processing to microphone arrays for airborne sound
- 2015 – John L. Butler – for advancing the field of acoustic transducer and transducer design.
- 2019 – Thomas B. Gabrielson – for contributions to the understanding of novel transducers and their intrinsic limitations imposed by thermal and quantum physics.

=== Silver Medal in Musical Acoustics ===
- 1981 – Carleen M. Hutchins – for outstanding contributions and leadership in the development of a new violin family of musical instruments, and for leadership in the acoustical research on bowed string musical instruments.
- 1984 – Arthur H. Benade – for pioneering research on the acoustics of brass and woodwind instruments and for leadership of a generation of musical acousticians.
- 1986 – John C. Backus – for pioneering research on the acoustics of woodwind and brass instruments, and for bridging the gap between acousticians and musicians.
- 1989 – Max V. Matthews – for pioneering work in electronic music and the applications of digital computers to musical acoustics.
- 1992 – Thomas D. Rossing – for major influence on research and teaching in musical acoustics and contributions to the understanding of percussion instruments.
- 1998 – Neville H. Fletcher – for contributions to understanding sound production and especially the role of nonlinear processes in string, wind, and percussion musical instruments.
- 2003 – Johan E.F. Sundberg – for contributions to understanding the acoustics of singing and musical performance and for leadership in musical acoustics.
- 2008 – Gabriel Weinreich – for contributions to violin and piano acoustics.
- 2013 – William J. Strong – for contributions to the understanding of wind instrument acoustics.
- 2019 – Murray D. Campbell – for contributions in understanding the acoustics of brass wind instruments.

=== Silver Medal in Noise ===
- 1978 – Harvey H. Hubbard – for contributions to the understanding of aircraft noise, its generation, propagation, and control, and its effects on people and structures.
- 1981 – Henning E. von Gierke – for contributions to noise control, for sustained national and international leadership in noise and electroacoustics standards, and for advancing the professional status of noise control engineering.
- 1984 – William W. Lang – for significant technical contributions to noise control, for sustained national and international leadership in noise and electroacoustics standards, and for advancing the professional status of noise control engineering.
- 1986 – Tony F. W. Embleton – for fundamental contributions to the theory and practice of noise control, and for international and national leadership in acoustics.
- 1988 – William J. Galloway – for contributions to aircraft and traffic noise assessment and community noise reduction.
- 1992 – George C. Maling, Jr. – for outstanding leadership in noise control and in the development of widely used internationally and nationally standardized methods for noise evaluations.
- 1994 – Kenneth M. Eldred – for contributions to noise control and environmental acoustics, and for leadership in the development of standards.
- 1999 – Larry H. Royster – for contributions to worldwide hearing conservation.
- 2002 – Louis C. Sutherland – for contributions to the solution of aerospace and community noise problems, and for studies of molecular absorption and classroom acoustics.
- 2006 – Alan H. Marsh – for contributions to the reduction of aircraft noise and for improvement to the quality of acoustical standards.
- 2009 – Michael R. Stinson – for contributions to outdoor sound propagation, acoustical materials, and ear canal acoustics.
- 2012 – Keith Attenborough – for contributions to noise control materials, ground impedance, and outdoor noise propagation.
- 2020 – Scott D. Sommerfeldt – for contributions to active noise and structural acoustic control.
- 2021 – Paul D. Schomer – for contributions to the understanding of the sources and effects of noise and for leadership in national and international acoustical standards.

=== Silver Medal in Physical Acoustics ===
- 1975 – Isadore Rudnick – for definitive contributions to many areas of physical acoustics, and ingenious experimental investigations of third and fourth sound in superfluid helium.
- 1977 – Martin Greenspan – for experimental and theoretical contributions to physical acoustics, particularly of sound in gases and liquids.
- 1979 – Herbert J. McSkimin – for contributions to science and engineering through research in physical acoustics.
- 1985 – David T. Blackstock – for contributions to our understanding of the propagation of finite amplitude sound through the use of the Burgers equation and weak shock theory and for national and international leadership in nonlinear acoustics.
- 1988 – Mack A. Breazeale – for pioneering work on nonlinear phenomena in ultrasonic wave propagation in solids and liquids.
- 1991 – Allan D. Pierce – for many significant contributions to acoustics: Its basic principles and applications.
- 1994 – Julian D. Maynard – for contributions to the thermodynamics of He II and to Anderson localization; to nearfield acoustic holography and acoustic spectroscopy.
- 1997 – Robert E. Apfel – for contributions to the understanding of acoustic cavitation, acoustic radiation pressure, and the bioeffects of medical ultrasound.
- 2000 – Gregory W. Swift – for theoretical and experimental contributions to the development of thermoacoustic engines.
- 2003 – Philip L. Marston – for contributions to generalized ray theories for acoustical scattering and the acoustical manipulation of fluids to study fundamental phenomena in fluid mechanics and optics.
- 2006 – Henry E. Bass – for leadership in physical acoustics and contributions to the understanding of atmospheric sound propagation.
- 2008 – Peter J. Westervelt – for fundamental contributions to nonlinear acoustics.
- 2012 - Andrea Prosperetti – for contributions to bubble dynamics and multiphase flow.
- 2017 - Evgenia A. Zabolotskaya – for contributions to nonlinear acoustics and bubble dynamics.
- 2019 - James M. Sabatier – for pioneering studies of acoustic-seismic coupling and its application in the humanitarian cause of detecting landmines.

=== Silver Medal in Psychological and Physiological Acoustics ===
- 1977 – Lloyd A. Jeffress – for extensive contributions in psychoacoustics, particularly binaural hearing, and for the example he has set as a teacher and scholar.
- 1981 – Ernest Glen Wever – for establishing the field of cochlear electrophysiology and advancing knowledge of middle and inner ear function.
- 1987 – Eberhard Zwicker – for prolific contributions to the understanding of fundamental auditory properties and for environmental, technological and clinical applications.
- 1990 – David M. Green – for outstanding experimental and theoretical contributions to hearing research and its methodology.
- 1994 – Nathaniel I. Durlach – for pioneering contributions to research concerning binaural hearing, intensity perception, hearing aids, tactile aids, and virtual reality.
- 2001 – Neal F. Viemeister – for contributions to the understanding of temporal and intensive aspects of hearing.
- 2002 – Brian C. J. Moore – for contributions to understanding human auditory perception, especially the perceptual consequences of peripheral frequency analysis in normal and impaired listeners.
- 2004 – H. Steven Colburn – for contributions to psychological and physiological aspects of binaural hearing.
- 2006 – William A. Yost – for contributions to understanding pitch perception, sound source localization, and auditory processing of complex sounds
- 2015 – Roy D. Patterson – for contributions to understanding pitch and timbre perception, and for computational modeling of auditory representations.
- 2021 – Ruth Y. Litovsky – for contributions to understanding binaural hearing and the perceptual consequences of providing bilateral cochlear implants.

=== Silver Medal in Signal Processing in Acoustics ===
- 2010 – Edmund J. Sullivan – for contributions to underwater acoustical model-based array signal processing.
- 2011 – Theodore G. Birdsall – for contributions to signal detection theory and development of coded sequences.
- 2015 – Brian G. Ferguson – for contributions to in-air and in-water acoustic classification, localization, and tracking.
- 2021 – William Hodgkiss – for contributions to at-sea experimentation and ocean acoustics signal processing.

=== Silver Medal in Speech Communication ===
- 1975 – Franklin S. Cooper – for theoretical, practical, and literary contributions to man's understanding of speech production, perception, and processing.
- 1980 – Gunnar Fant – for scientific work in providing coherence and theoretical underpinnings to the complex human activity of speech production and for his qualities of leadership that have helped to bring this field to its present level.
- 1983 – Kenneth N. Stevens – for contributions to our understanding of the production acoustic-phonetic properties, and the perception of speech and how we may join speech and technology in ways useful to man.
- 1987 – Dennis H. Klatt – for fundamental and applied contributions to the synthesis and recognition of speech.
- 1991 – Arthur S. House – for contributions to the understanding of speech production, perception, and recognition.
- 1994 – Peter Ladefoged – for advancing knowledge of the theory of acoustic phonetics and phonology using acoustic field data from many of the world's languages.
- 1997 – Patricia K. Kuhl – for contributions to the understanding of innate and learned aspects of speech perception and production.
- 2005 – Katherine S. Harris – for research and leadership in speech production.
- 2007 – Ingo R. Titze – for contributions to fundamental understanding of the physics and biomechanics of vocal fold vibration and for interdisciplinary work in voice studies.
- 2009 – Winifred Strange – for contributions to understanding speech perception.
- 2010 – David B. Pisoni – for advancing the basic science of speech perception and recognition, and applying that knowledge to the clinical field of cochlear implantation.
- 2014 – Sheila E. Blumstein – for contributions to understanding how acoustic signals are transformed into linguistic representations.
- 2015 – John J. Ohala – for advancing the understanding of speech production and perception and applying phonetic principles to the study of spoken language change over time.
- 2020 – Anne Cutler – for contributions to understanding speech recognition by native and non-native listeners, and leadership in speech science.
- 2021 – Joanne L. Miller – for contributions to the understanding of phonetic and lexical processing in speech perception.

== Interdisciplinary Silver Medal ==
If the nomination is made by two or more technical committees the Silver Medal is known as the Helmholtz-Rayleigh Interdisciplinary Silver Medal. Recipients include

- 1983 – Eugen J. Skudrzyk (Theoretical and Applied Acoustics) – For his extensive contributions to the advancement of acoustics through his tireless multifaceted activities as author, researcher, and teacher.
- 1990 – Wesley L. Nyborg (Physical Acoustics and Bioresponse to Vibration) – For technical contributions in the application of physical acoustics to biology and medicine.
- 1991 – W. Dixon Ward (Psychological and Physiological Acoustics, Musical Acoustics, and Noise) – For furthering the knowledge of auditory perception in psychological and musical acoustics and increasing the understanding of the etiology of noise-induced hearing loss.
- 1992 – Victor C. Anderson (Underwater Acoustics and Engineering Acoustics) – For pioneering underwater sound research in ambient noise and for the invention and engineering development of the delay time compression (DELTIC) correlator and digital multibeam steering (DIMUS) sonar.
- 1993 – Steven L. Garrett (Physical Acoustics and Engineering Acoustics) – For leadership in transferring fundamental concepts of fiber optics and thermoacoustics into practical applications.
- 1997 – Gerhard M. Sessler (Engineering Acoustics and Physical Acoustics) – For contributions to electret transducers and the understanding of sound propagation in gases.
- 1998 – David E. Weston (Acoustical Oceanography and Underwater Acoustics) – For seminal work on the physics of explosive sources, scattering, and the horizontal refraction of sound.
- 1999 – Jens P. Blauert (Psychological and Physiological Acoustics, Architectural Acoustics, and Noise) – For contributions to sound localization, concert hall acoustics, signal processing, and acoustics standards.
- 2000 – Lawrence A. Crum (Physical Acoustics and Biomedical Ultrasound/Bioresponse to Vibration) – For advancing the understanding of the physical, chemical, and biological effects of acoustic cavitation and of high-intensity ultrasound.
- 2001 – William M. Hartmann (Musical Acoustics, Psychological and Physiological Acoustics and Architectural Acoustics) – For research and education in psychological and physiological acoustics, architectural acoustics, musical acoustics, and signal processing.
- 2002 – Arthur B. Baggeroer (Underwater Acoustics, Acoustical Oceanography and Signal Processing in Acoustics) – For applications of model-based signal processing to underwater acoustics and for contributions to Arctic acoustics.
- 2004 – David Lubman (Silver Medal in Architectural Acoustics and Noise) – For work in noise and standards and for contributions to architectural and archeological acoustics.
- 2005 – Gilles A. Daigle (Noise and Physical Acoustics) – For contributions to understanding the effects of micrometeorology, topography, and ground properties on outdoor sound propagation.
- 2006 – Mathias Fink (Biomedical Ultrasound/Bioresponse to Vibration, and Acoustical Oceanography) – For contributions to the understanding of time reversal acoustics.
- 2007 – Edwin L. Carstensen (Biomedical Ultrasound/Bioresponse to Vibration and Physical Acoustics) – For contributions to the physics of biomedical ultrasound.
- 2008 – James V. Candy (Signal Processing and Underwater Acoustics) – For contributions to signal processing and underwater acoustics.
- 2010 – Ronald A. Roy (Biomedical Ultrasound/Bioresponse to Vibration and Physical Acoustics) – For contributions to the fields of biomedical ultrasound and nonlinear bubble dynamics.
- 2011 – James E. Barger (Underwater Acoustics and Engineering Acoustics) – For the development of technologies in source and receiver design and signal processing.
- 2013 – Timothy G. Leighton (Biomedical Acoustics, Physical Acoustics, and Acoustical Oceanography) – For contributions to physical acoustics, biomedical ultrasound, sonochemistry, and acoustical oceanography.
- 2014 – Mark F. Hamilton (Physical Acoustics, Biomedical Acoustics, and Engineering Acoustics) – For contributions to nonlinear acoustics and biomedical ultrasound.
- 2015 – Henry Cox (Underwater acoustics and Sonar Systems Engineering) – For fundamental and practical contributions to array signal processing, underwater acoustics, and sonar systems engineering.
- 2016 – Armen Sarvazyan (Physical Acoustics, Biomedical Acoustics, and Engineering Acoustics) – for contributions to ultrasound imaging and its applications.
- 2017 – Blake S. Wilson (Psychological and Physiological Acoustics, Speech Communication, and Signal Processing in Acoustics) – for contributions to the development and adoption of cochlear implants.
- 2018 – Kenneth S. Suslick (Physical Acoustics and Biomedical Acoustics) – for contributions to the acoustics of sonochemistry.
- 2019 – Barbara Shinn-Cunningham (Psychological and Physiological Acoustics, Speech Communication, and Architectural Acoustics) – for contributions to understanding the perceptual, cognitive, and neural bases of speech perception in complex acoustic environments.
- 2021 – Michael Moldover (Physical Acoustics and Engineering Acoustics) – for establishing spherical acoustic resonators as the foundation of the kelvin in the International System of Units.
- 2022 – George Augspurger (Architectural Acoustics and Engineering Acoustics) – for contributions to design of recording studios, performance venues, and loudspeakers, and for decades of patent reviews.
- 2023 – Vera A. Khokhlova (Biomedical Acoustics and Physical Acoustics) – for contributions to the application of nonlinear acoustics to medical ultrasound.

== See also ==
- List of physics awards
