= Deutsche Gesellschaft für Akustik =

Deutsche Gesellschaft für Akustik e.V. (DEGA) (German society for acoustics) was established 1988 to promote research and application of acoustics.

DEGA is a member of the European Acoustics Association (EAA), the International Commission for Acoustics (ICA) and the International Institute of Noise Control Engineering (I-INCE). It has about 2.000 members (2020).

DEGA is the organizer of the annual German acoustics conference Deutsche Jahrestagung für Akustik (DAGA) in March. First DAGA was held in 1970 by the Deutsche Arbeitsgemeinschaft für Akustik.

== Helmholtz-Medaille ==
- 1991 Eberhard Zwicker (posthum)
- 1993 Gerhard M. Sessler
- 1994 Wolfgang Kraak
- 1995 Manfred R. Schroeder
- 1996 Heinrich Kuttruff
- 1997 Fridolin P. Mechel and Manfred Heckl (posthum)
- 1999 Helmut A. Müller
- 2000 Arno Lenk
- 2001 Jens Blauert
- 2002 Karl Gösele
- 2003 Wolfgang Eisenmenger
- 2004 Jürgen Meyer
- 2005 Volker Mellert
- 2006 Ernst Terhardt
- 2007 Werner Schirmer
- 2008 Frank J. Fahy
- 2009 Peter Költzsch
- 2010 Hugo Fastl
- 2011 Judith Lang
- 2012 Wolfgang Fasold
- 2013 Werner Lauterborn
- 2014 Michael Möser
- 2015 Lothar Gaul
- 2016 Joachim Scheuren
- 2017 Armin Kohlrausch
- 2018 Wolfgang Ahnert
- 2019 Diemer de Vries and Sonoko Kuwano
- 2020 Reinhard Lerch
