= Paul A. Johnson (geophysicist) =

American geophysicist

- Education: University of New Mexico (BS); University of Arizona (MS); Pierre and Marie Curie University (PhD)
- Honors: Fellow, Acoustical Society of America (2005); Fellow, Los Alamos National Laboratory (2008); Fellow, American Geophysical Union (2011); Fellow, American Physical Society (2016)
- Scientific career
- Fields: Geophysics, nonlinear acoustics, rock physics
- Workplaces: Los Alamos National Laboratory

Paul Allan Johnson is an American geophysicist and a Laboratory Fellow at Los Alamos National Laboratory. His research covers fault physics and nonlinear acoustics, and he is a Fellow of the American Physical Society, the American Geophysical Union, and the Acoustical Society of America.

== Education ==
Johnson received a BS in geology from the University of New Mexico in 1978 and an MS in geophysics from the University of Arizona in 1984. In 1997, he received a doctorate from Pierre and Marie Curie University for a thesis on nonlinear dynamic elasticity in geological materials.

== Career ==
Johnson joined the Geophysics Group at Los Alamos National Laboratory in 1984. From 1990, he led the laboratory's nonlinear elasticity research team. He was named the Laboratory Fellow in 2008.

== Research ==
=== Nonlinear elasticity of rock ===
Rocks' mechanical behavior often deviates from linear elastic (i.e., Hooke's law) because they contain compliant defects such as cracks, microfractures, and grain joints. In a 1996 paper with P. N. J. Rasolofosaon, Johnson measured the second- and third-order nonlinear elastic constants of rock samples. With Robert A. Guyer and James TenCate, he later reported hysteresis in the dynamic elasticity of consolidated granular materials. They found that the resonance frequency and attenuation of a rock sample vary with strain amplitude, which is a phenomenon that cannot be explained or predicted by classical elasticity theory. Guyer and Johnson argued that rocks, concrete, damaged composites, and similar materials behave as a separate class of solids, whose elastic response is controlled by a mesoscopic population of soft bonds.

=== Earthquake triggering and fault physics ===
Johnson and Xiaoping Jia proposed that the nonlinear elastic response of granular fault gouge could be the mechanism by which very small dynamic strains can weaken a fault close to failure. In later laboratory experiments on sheared layers of glass beads, Johnson's group showed that acoustic vibration can trigger small slip events and change stick-slip cycles for some time afterward, suggesting that seismic waves can alter the timing of earthquakes on tectonic faults.

=== Machine learning in seismology ===
Beginning in the mid-2010s, Johnson and his colleagues at Los Alamos National Laboratory applied machine learning to continuous acoustic data from laboratory shear experiments. They observed that the most informative predictive signals came from low-amplitude signals that the researchers had earlier treated as noise.

Johnson's group subsequently applied these machine learning techniques to field seismic records from Vancouver Island. In a 2025 study, Johnson's team adapted Wav2Vec 2.0, a self-supervised machine learning model built for speech recognition, to seismic signals from the 2018 caldera collapse at Kīlauea. The model successfully predicts the surface displacement during the slip sequence, although they admit that predicting the displacement a short time ahead remains very difficult.

== Awards and honors ==
- Fellow of the Acoustical Society of America, 2005
- Fellow of the Los Alamos National Laboratory, 2008
- Fellow of the American Geophysical Union, 2011
- Fellow of the American Physical Society, 2016

== Selected publications ==
=== Book ===
- Guyer, R. A.; Johnson, P. A. (2009). Nonlinear Mesoscopic Elasticity: The Complex Behaviour of Granular Media including Rocks and Soil. Weinheim: Wiley-VCH.

=== Articles ===
- Johnson, P. A.; Rasolofosaon, P. N. J. (February 10, 1996). "Nonlinear elasticity and stress-induced anisotropy in rock". Journal of Geophysical Research: Solid Earth. 101 (B2): 3113–3124. doi:10.1029/95JB02880.
- Guyer, R. A.; TenCate, J.; Johnson, P. (April 19, 1999). "Hysteresis and the dynamic elasticity of consolidated granular materials". Physical Review Letters. 82 (16): 3280–3283. doi:10.1103/PhysRevLett.82.3280.
- Guyer, R. A.; Johnson, P. A. (April 1999). "Nonlinear mesoscopic elasticity: Evidence for a new class of materials". Physics Today. 52 (4): 30–36. doi:10.1063/1.882648.
- Johnson, P. A.; Jia, X. (October 6, 2005). "Nonlinear dynamics, granular media and dynamic earthquake triggering". Nature. 437 (7060): 871–874. doi:10.1038/nature04015.
- Johnson, P. A.; Savage, H.; Knuth, M.; Gomberg, J.; Marone, C. (January 3, 2008). "Effects of acoustic waves on stick–slip in granular media and implications for earthquakes". Nature. 451 (7174): 57–60. doi:10.1038/nature06440.
- Rouet-Leduc, B.; Hulbert, C.; Lubbers, N.; Barros, K.; Humphreys, C. J.; Johnson, P. A. (September 2017). "Machine learning predicts laboratory earthquakes". Geophysical Research Letters. 44 (18): 9276–9282. arXiv:1702.05774. doi:10.1002/2017GL074677.
- Rouet-Leduc, B.; Hulbert, C.; Johnson, P. A. (January 2019). "Continuous chatter of the Cascadia subduction zone revealed by machine learning". Nature Geoscience. 12 (1): 75–79. arXiv:1805.06689. doi:10.1038/s41561-018-0274-6.
- Johnson, C. W.; Wang, K.; Johnson, P. A. (January 27, 2025). "Automatic speech recognition predicts contemporaneous earthquake fault displacement". Nature Communications. 16 (1) 1069. doi:10.1038/s41467-025-55994-9.
