= Degas (disambiguation) =

Edgar Degas French artist.

Degas may also refer to:

- Degas (crater), a crater on Mercury
- DEGAS (software), a bitmap graphics editor
- Degas, Iran, a village in Kerman Province, Iran
- Degasification or degas, the removal of gas from liquids

== See also ==
- Dega (disambiguation)
