= Zabolotsky =

Zabolotsky (Russian: Заболоцкий) is a Russian masculine surname, its feminine counterpart is Zabolotskaya. It originated from the phrase za bolotom (behind a swamp), indicating the place where a person lived. The surname may refer to

- Evgenia Zabolotskaya (1935–2020), Russian-American acoustic engineer
- Lidiya Zabolotskaya, Belarusian singer in the Junior Eurovision Song Contest 2011
- Lyubov Zabolotskaya (born 1956), Soviet cross-country skier
- Nikolay Zabolotsky (1903–1958), Russian poet, children's writer and translator
- Sergey Zabolotsky (born 1983), Belarusian football player
- Yelena Zabolotskaya, editor of the 1988 film Little Vera
