= James A. Simmons =

James A. Simmons is a pioneer in the field of biosonar. His research includes behavioral and neurophysiological studies of sound processing in the echolocating bat. From the time he began graduate research in the late 1960s to the present, he has been in the forefront of bat echolocation research. Simmons was honored as a fellow of the Acoustical Society of America (ASA) in 1996 and of the American Association for the Advancement of Science in 2000. He was awarded the ASA's second Silver Medal in Animal Bioacoustics in 2005. His current position is Professor in the Department of Neuroscience, Brown University.

== Education ==
Simmons obtained his bachelor's degree from Lafayette College in 1965 with a double major in Psychology and Chemistry. He then earned a master's degree in 1968 and a Ph.D. in Psychology in 1969 from Princeton University. Simmons's graduate research involved studies of echolocation in bats, under the mentorship of E. Glen Wever, one of the giants in physiological acoustics. At that time, acceptance of the processes underlying spatial perception by echolocation was not universal, and one of the exciting moments of his graduate training came when a skeptical Nobel Laureate, Georg von Békésy, on one of his periodic visits to Wever's lab, came to see the behaving bats in "Building B. The demonstration that Simmons conducted not only convinced Békésy that bats echolocated but that they also use echo delay to estimate target distance. It was not until some years later that Simmons found out that this was a set-up engineered by Wever and Donald Griffin, who was then at the Rockefeller University, to convince Békésy about the bat's extraordinary use of echolocation to determine target range. Simmons's dissertation was entitled "Perception of target distance by echolocating bats. After receiving his Ph.D., Simmons remained at Princeton University as a National Institutes of Health postdoctoral trainee for two years.

== Research ==
Simmons continued his research on bat echolocation after he moved to Washington University in St. Louis, Missouri in 1971, as an assistant professor in the Neural Science Program that was housed in the Psychology Department. Between 1980 and 1984, he taught and conducted research as a professor in the Department of Biology and Institute of Neuroscience, University of Oregon in Eugene, Oregon. In 1984, Simmons moved to Brown University in Providence, Rhode Island, where his wife Andrea had been hired as an assistant professor in the Psychology Department. Both are now professors in the Neuroscience and Psychology Departments at Brown University, respectively.

Simmons developed methods for conducting psychophysical studies of sonar processing by bats, and researchers around the world have adopted these methods to address a wide range of research questions. Simmons was the first to use electronically delayed playbacks of the bat's echolocation signals to simulate target echoes for the study of perception in bats. He used such "phantom" target echoes to measure, for the first time, target range difference discrimination thresholds of echolocating bats. Simmons studied sonar ranging performance in bats by determining the minimum difference in echo delay that an echolocating animal can discriminate. With this paradigm, Simmons estimated that bats can discriminate a range difference of approximately 1 centimeter, corresponding to an echo delay difference of approximately 60 microseconds.

Simmons continued to study sonar ranging performance in echolocating bats, and in the late 1970s, he introduced a new behavioral task, requiring the bat to discriminate a sonar target returning echoes at a fixed delay from one returning echoes that alternated between two delays. In this experiment, Simmons found that the echolocating bat can discriminate a jitter in echo delay in the submicrosecond range, corresponding to a change in target distance of less than 0.1 mm. This result, originally published in 1979 in Science, "Perception of echo phase information in bat sonar," demonstrated astonishing ranging accuracy by the echolocating bat. Many researchers in the field challenged the report, because they asserted it was not biologically possible for the bat's sonar system to discriminate such small time differences at ultrasonic frequencies. Simmons continues to work on this problem to explore biological processes that could support sensitivity to small changes in echo delay.

Through behavioral experiments, Simmons demonstrated time-varying gain in the sonar receiver of echolocating bats. The hearing sensitivity of the big brown bat decreases before each sonar pulse is emitted and then recovers in a logarithmic fashion to compensate for the two-way transmission loss of sonar returns, thereby maintaining a constant echo sensation level over a distance of about 1.5 meters. This is functionally important to the bat, as it stabilizes the bat's estimate of echo arrival time, its cue for target distance.

In addition to Simmons's contributions to our understanding of perception by sonar, he has conducted neurophysiological experiments in echolocating bats. One of his manuscripts published with co-authors Albert Feng and Shelley Kick in Science had a profound impact on the study of the neurophysiology of echolocating bats. This paper describes the response properties of auditory neurons in the bat central nervous system that show facilitated responses to pairs of sounds separated by a limited range of biologically relevant delays. These neurons exhibit the response characteristic known as "echo delay-tuning or "range-tuning, which could provide the neural substrate for target distance coding. The published report on this population of delay-tuned neurons by Simmons and colleagues preceded the first papers by Nobuo Suga and his group, who have since published widely on this topic.

In the past five years, Simmons has used new methods for making thermal infrared video recordings of bats flying in natural situations. He developed a stereo video viewing system that lets him observe bats in 3D and listen to their sounds while they behave. These studies have led to new discoveries that challenge our understanding of echolocation behavior in bats.

== Awards and honors ==
- 1965: James McKeen Cattell Prize, Lafayette College Psychology Department.
- 1969: National Institutes of Health Research Scientist Development Award
- 1996: Elected a fellow of the Acoustical Society of America
- 2000: Elected a fellow of the American Association for the Advancement of Science
- 2005: Silver Medal in Animal Bioacoustics, Acoustical Society of America, "for contributions to understanding bat echolocation."

== Scientific Publications ==
Simmons has published extensively, with over 95 journal articles in prestigious journals including 8 in Science, 2 in Nature, and 20 in the Journal of the Acoustical Society of America (JASA).
