= Dega =

Dega may refer to:

== Geography ==
- Dega, Burkina Faso
- Dega (woreda), Ethiopia
- Dega, Lorestan, Iran
- Dega, Zanjan, Iran

== People ==
- Dega (footballer) (born 1974), Brazilian footballer
- Louis Dega, fictional French criminal
- Wiktor Dega (1896–1995), Polish surgeon
- Dega Deva Kumar Reddy (born 1958), educationist and entrepreneur

== Other uses ==
- Dega (film), a 2014 Telugu-language film
- Deutsche Gesellschaft für Akustik (DEGA), German society for acoustics
- Talladega Superspeedway, a motorsports complex in Talladega, Alabama
- Dega or Degar (Đềga), indigenous people of the Central Highlands of Vietnam

== See also ==
- Degas (disambiguation)
- Deigo
