= Anatoly Sukhorukov =

Russian physicist (1935–2014)

Anatoly Petrovich Sukhorukov
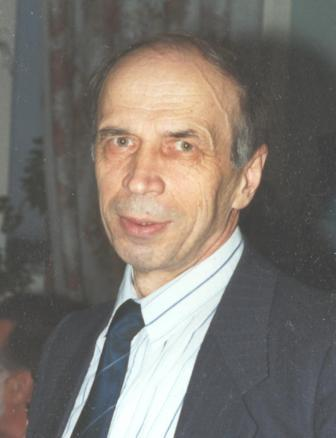
- Sukhorukov in 2010
- Born: 29 November 1935; Moscow, USSR
- Died: 10 April 2014 (aged 78)
- Education: Moscow State University
- Awards: USSR State Prize (1984); Lenin Prize (1988); Order of Friendship (2013)
- Scientific career
- Fields: Nonlinear optics, Radiophysics, Acoustics
- Workplaces: Moscow State University
- Doctoral advisor: Rem Khokhlov

Anatoly Petrovich Sukhorukov (Russian: Анато́лий Петро́вич Сухору́ков, 29 November 1935 – 10 April 2014) was a Soviet and Russian physicist who made fundamental contributions to the development of the theory of waves and nonlinear interactions in optics, radiophysics, and acoustics.

== Biography ==
Graduated with honours from the Chair of Physics of Oscillations, MSU Faculty of Physics in 1961. He returned to this department in 1963 to do a PhD course after working for three years as a junior researcher at the Institute of computer control.

In 1967 he defended a PhD thesis on the topic "Diffracting beams in nonlinear media" under the supervision of academician R. V. Khokhlov. In 1974 he has passed habilitation and received a doctoral degree in physical and mathematical sciences. The topic of his Doktor nauk work was "Wave beams and pulses in nonlinear media". In 1977 he received a professor title at the Chair of General Physics and Wave Processes.

Since 1966, he had worked at the Faculty of Physics – first as a senior engineer, then assistant, senior lecturer, associate professor, and full professor (from 1976). In 1984–1989 he served as a head of Division of Radiophysics and Electronics. In 1989–1992 he worked as a dean of the Faculty of Physics. From 1988 to 2014, he was a head of the Chair of Photonics and Microwave Physics (previous department name until 2008 – Department of Radiophysics).

== Scientific achievements ==
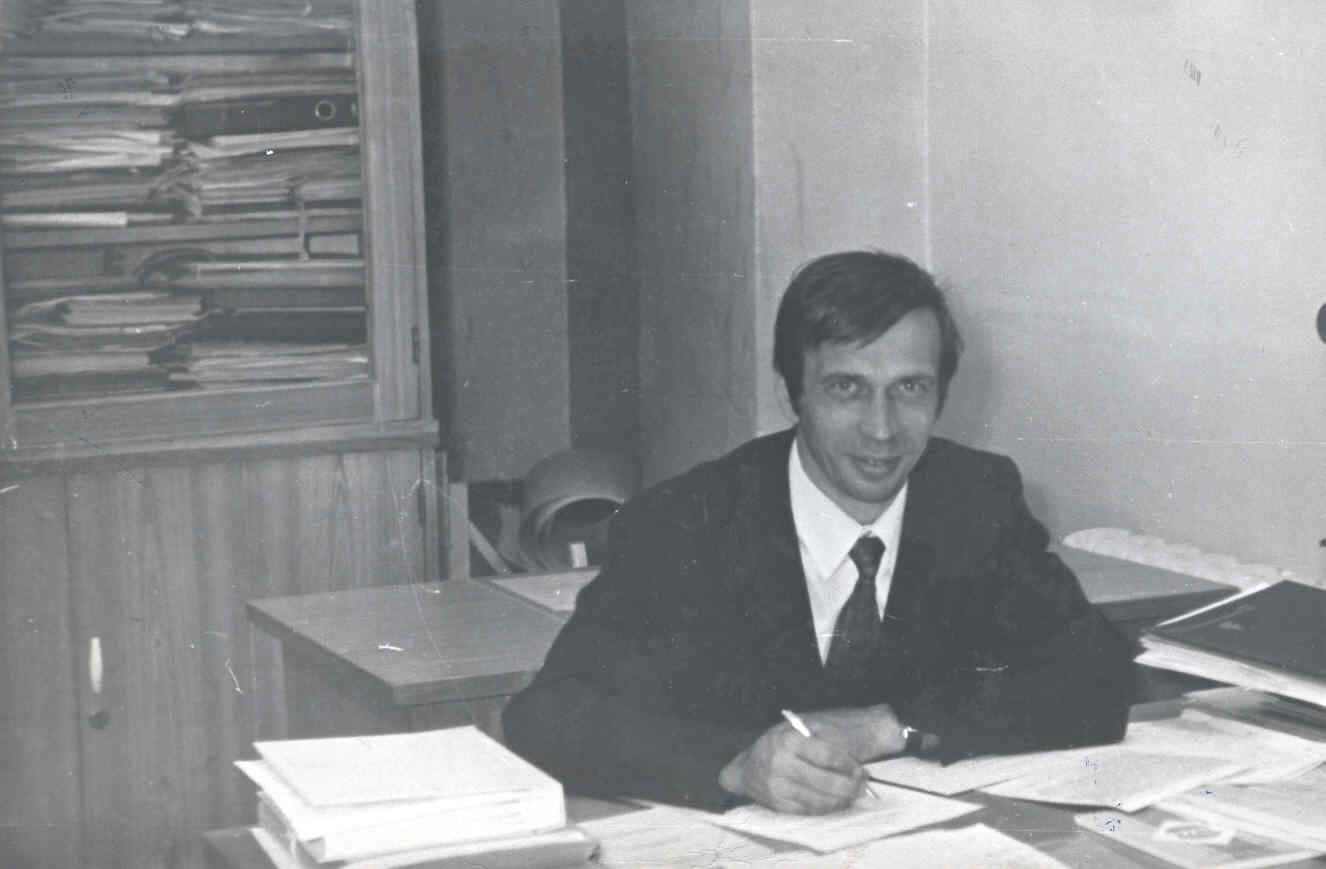
Anatoly P. Sukhorukov at a work desk (1971)

Anatoly. P. Sukhorukov has made fundamental contributions to the development of the theory of waves and nonlinear interactions in optics, radiophysics, and acoustics. Among his many achievements, the results discussed here were most valued by the scientist, as being most important and influential for the subsequent development of corresponding research fields.

His scientific interests lied mainly in the area to nonlinear optics. He was one of the founders of modern theoretical nonlinear optics. He obtained, in particular, a number of pioneering results on self-focusing and parametric interactions, which were later confirmed in experiments. In a series of works on self-focusing (since 1966) he has developed for the first time the aberration-free theory of wave self-action, found exact solutions for ray patterns accounting for nonlinear aberrations, and numerically investigated different regimes of spatial resonant self-focusing. Many of his theoretical predictions have been confirmed in experiments: aberrational structures due to wave self-focusing in nematics, limited lifetime of spatial solitons in media with relaxation-type nonlinearity, dynamics of thermal defocusing in the presence of forced and free convection, self-deflection of beams in nonlinear moving media, laser-induced transparency of a cloudy medium and an ozone layer, adaptive compensation of beam distortions in nonlinear media. Anatoly Sukhorukov has derived the general paraxial equation describing beam diffraction in anisotropic crystals, and originated the paraxial theory for three-wave interactions of beams and pulses under the presence of phase- and group-velocity mismatches, diffraction, and group velocity dispersion. He has developed a spatio-temporal analogy between optical beams and pulses, and predicted the effect of diffraction-dispersion incoherence for modulated waves, which limits the efficiency of frequency conversion and results in parametric mutual focusing in quadratic media. He has also predicted the phenomenon of anomalous diffraction in the parametric amplifier, and determined the optimal conditions for high-efficiency generation of the second and third harmonics in focused laser beams. He has first investigated the possibility of total energy conversion in the process of double phase-matched interaction between three frequency harmonics. He has developed the theory of up- and down parametric frequency conversion under the presence of group velocity mismatch, described the formation of three-frequency optical dissipative solitons, parametric pi – pulses, a giant parametric pulse (confirmed experimentally), calculated the modes of the parametrical amplifier with a pulsed pump, developed the theory of stimulated Raman scattering taking into account the relaxation time and group velocity mismatch, found the quasi-phase-matching conditions for slow and fast modes in 3D photonic crystals. He has predicted the existence of a new class of localized structures – parametric three-frequency solitons in media with quadratic nonlinearity (results published in 1974, confirmed experimentally in 1995), also discovered a new type of wave self-focusing, namely, mutual – focusing of just three beams at different frequencies in quadratic media. He has investigated the walk-off effect on quadratic solitons, analyzed dynamics of spatial soliton trapping and interactions in bulk media, in cavities (based on the full round-trip model), in gratings (model for counter-propagating waves); proposed parametric soliton model based on the analogy with coupling of three quasi-particles; considered the tunneling of slow parametric solitons through a bounded grating. He has analyzed the quasi-phase-matched hybrid interactions in periodically polled crystals (layer model), asymmetric modes of parametric solitons, properties of ultra-narrow quadratic solitons, propagation of ultra-short optical pulses inducing plasma generation, and parametric interactions of two non-axial vortices, methods of spatio-temporal vortices generation and recording, all-optical switching with parametric refraction and reflection. He developed the theory of dispersion managed interactions of few-cycle pulses in quadratically nonlinear layered media. He has investigated the nonlinear refraction, total internal reflection and scattering of optical beams and pulses in defocusing media with Kerr, cascaded quadratic, photorefractive, and thermal nonlinearities.

== Educational activities ==
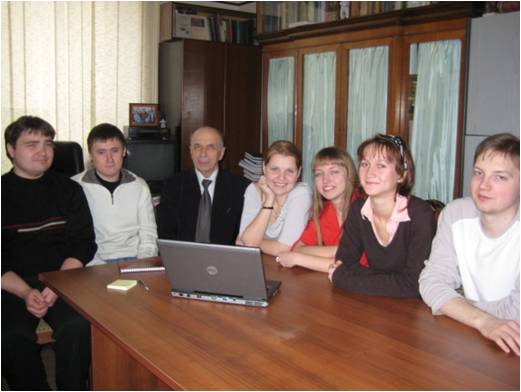
A. P. Sukhorukov in office with students and staff

A. P. Sukhorukov devoted much efforts to educate students. He was one of the leading lecturers at the Faculty of Physics. He has developed and taught for over 40 years a one-year course on "Theory of waves". He has co-authored a textbook on the course subject, now in its 2nd ed., which became a reference book for students and researchers.

Scientific school created by A. P. Sukhorukov on the topic of "Physics of wave interactions in inhomogeneous and nonlinear media" is building on traditions established at Lomonosov Moscow State University by academician R. V. Khokhlov. A. P. Sukhorukov has supervised more than 80 graduate students as the Faculty of Physics, 36 PhD students, and 8 habilitation works. Together with colleagues and students, he has successfully carried out multiple scientific projects. He has organized annual Russian schools-seminars on wave phenomena for students and young scientists during 1995–2014.

== Publications ==
A. P. Sukhorukov has published more than 400 scientific papers and several books, including two monographs:

- Sukhorukov, A. P. (1988). Nonlinear wave interactions in optics and radiophysics (Google translation from English) (in Russian). Moscow: Nauka. p. 230. ISBN 5-02-013842-8.
- Karamzin, Yu. N.; Sukhorukov, A. P.; Trofimov, V. A. (1989). Mathematical modelling in nonlinear optics (Google translation to English) (in Russian). Moscow: Moscow University Press. p. 153. ISBN 5-211-00336-5.

and two textbooks:

- Vinogradova, M. B.; Rudenko, O. V.; Sukhorukov, A. P. (1990). Theory of waves: textbook for physics qualifications in higher education (Google translation to English) (in Russian) (2nd, revised and extended ed.). Moscow: Nauka. p. 432. ISBN 5-02-014050-3.
- Alekseev, Yu. K.; Sukhorukov, A. P. (2009). Introduction to the catastrophe theory (Google translation to English) (in Russian) (2nd, extended ed.). Moscow: URSS. p. 171. ISBN 978-5-397-00237-0.

== Awards and prizes ==
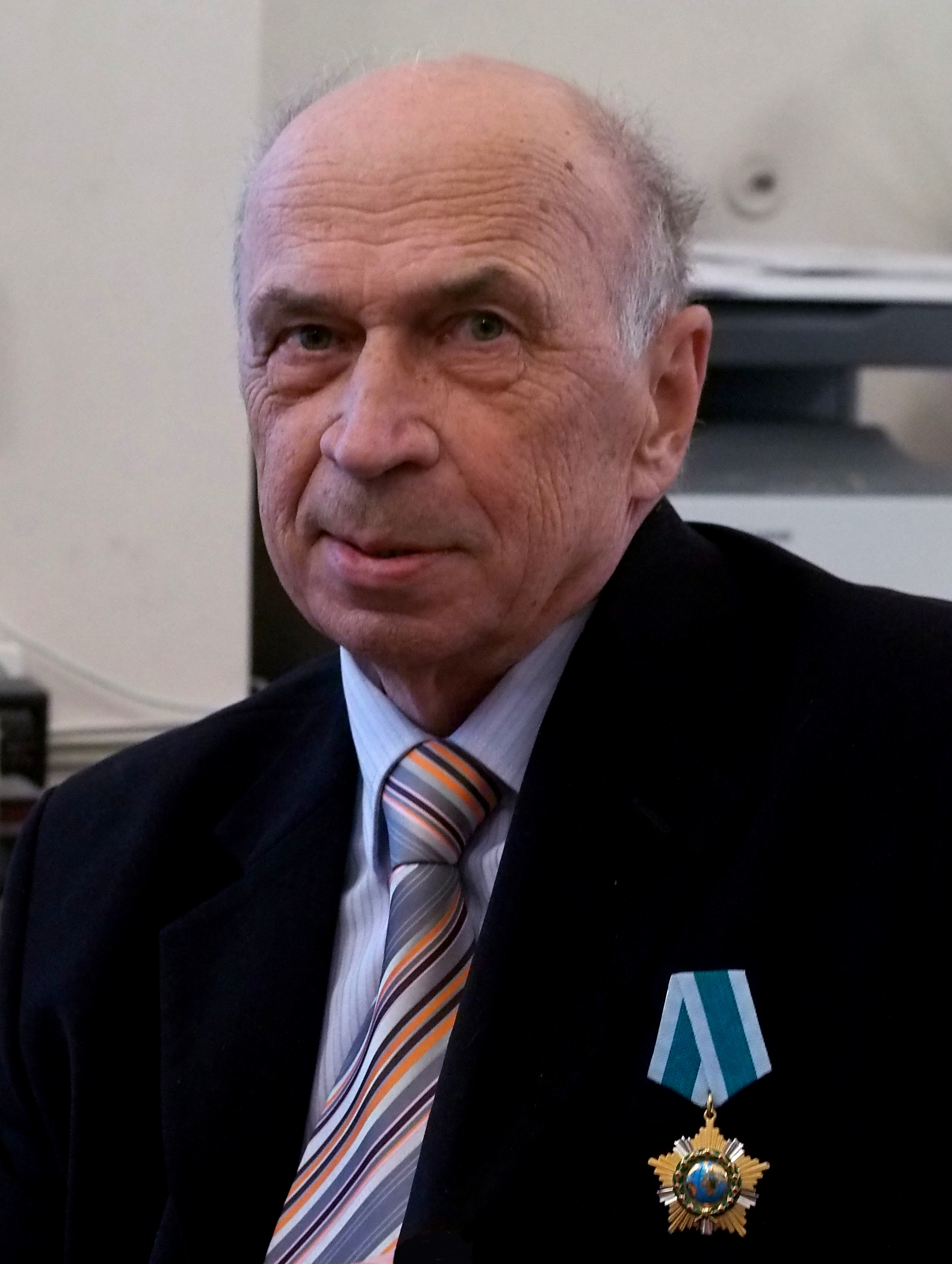
Anatoly P. Sukhorukov with Order of Friendship in 2013

- Commemorative badge "225 years of MSU" (1980)
- USSR State Prize in science and technology (1984), A series of works on "Highly efficient nonlinear frequency conversion in crystals and the development of tuneable sources of coherent radiation" (1963—1982)
- Lenin Prize in science and technology (1988), Discovery and investigation of the self-focusing effects of wave beams
- Medal "Veteran of Labour" (1988)
- Distinguished scientist of Russian Federation (1996)
- Medal "In Commemoration of the 850th Anniversary of Moscow" (1997)
- Distinguished professor of Lomonosov Moscow State University (2003)
- Commemorative badge "250 years of MSU" (2004)
- M. V. Lomonosov Prize by Lomonosov Moscow State University for scientific research of II degree (2006), – for a series of works on "Nonlinear wave phenomena in layered structures, media with spatial and temporal dispersion, and their applications in photonics"
- Order of Friendship (2013), Achievements in education and productive work over many years
