= Paul Erlich =

American music theorist

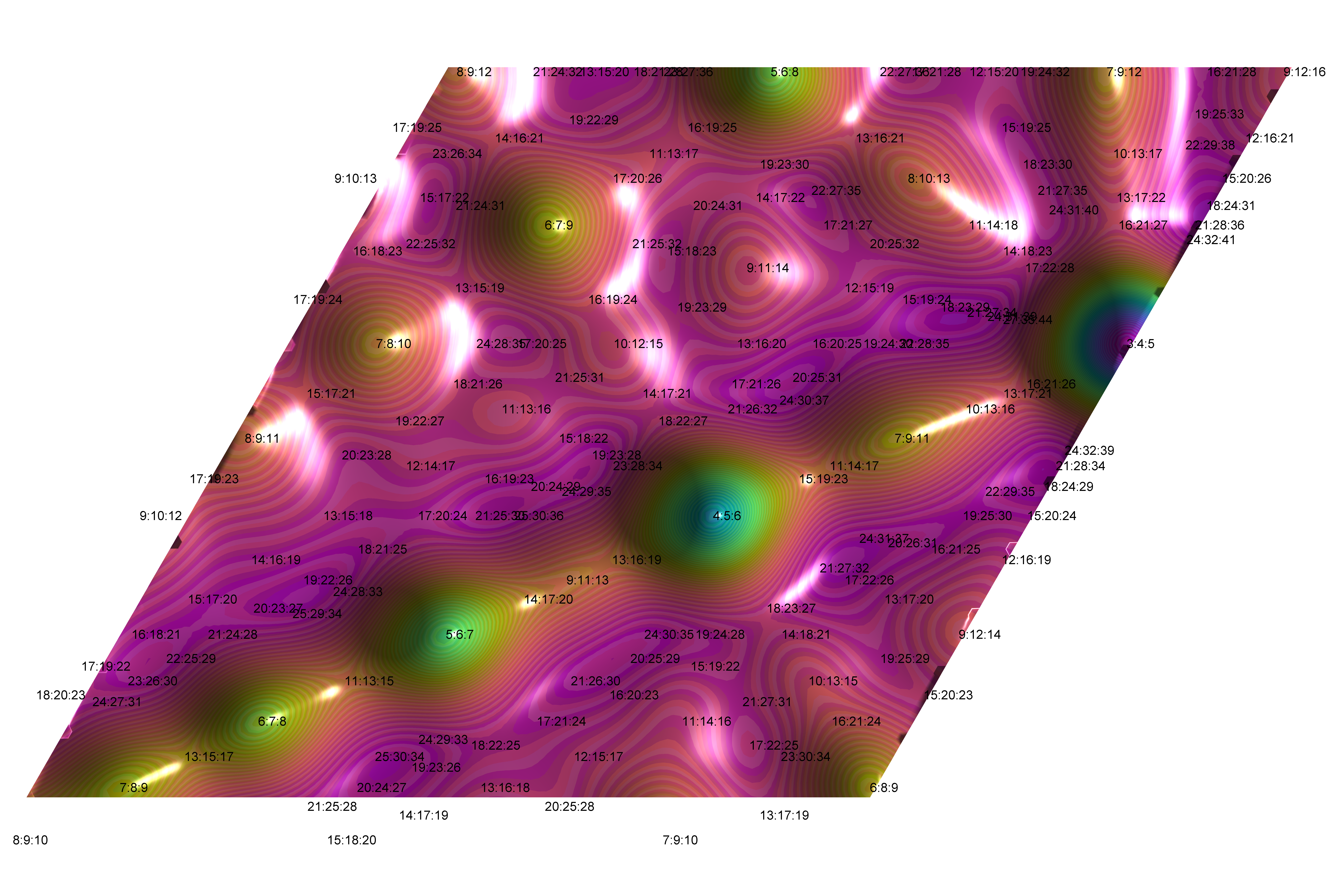
Harmonic entropy for triads with lower interval and upper interval each ranging from 200 to 500 cents. Compare 4:5:6, 6:7:9, and 10:12:15. See full resolution for locations of the triads on the plot

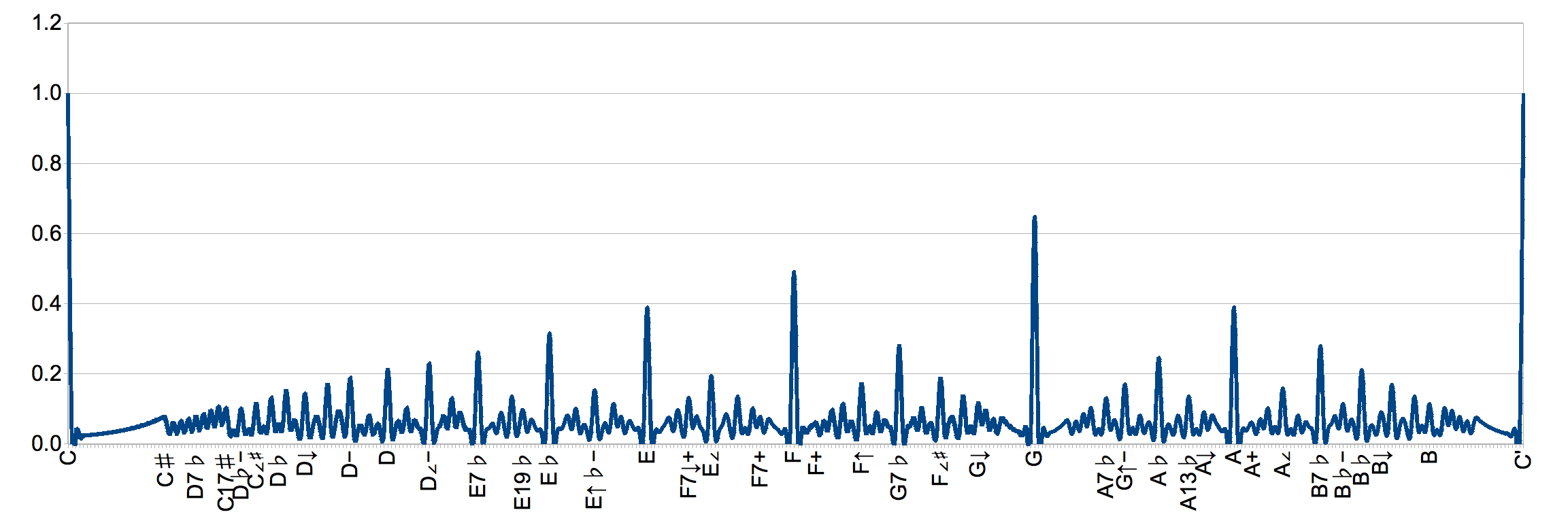
The space around intervals is shown above for the Farey sequence, order 50.

Paul Erlich (born 1972) is a guitarist and music theorist living near Boston, Massachusetts. He is known for his seminal role in developing the theory of regular temperaments, including being the first to define pajara temperament and its decatonic scales in 22-ET. He holds a Bachelor of Science degree in physics from Yale University.

His definition of harmonic entropy, a refinement of a model by van Eck influenced by Ernst Terhardt has received attention from music theorists such as William Sethares. It is intended to model one of the components of dissonance as a measure of the uncertainty of the virtual pitch ("missing fundamental") evoked by a set of two or more pitches. This measures how easy or difficult it is to fit the pitches into a single harmonic series. For example, most listeners rank a ${4:5:6:7}$ harmonic seventh chord as far more consonant than a $\tfrac{1}{4:5:6:7}$ chord. Both have exactly the same set of intervals between the notes, under inversion, but the first one is easy to fit into a single harmonic series (overtones rather than undertones). In the harmonic series, the integers are much lower for the harmonic seventh chord, ${4:5:6:7}$, versus its inverse, ${105:120:140:168}$. Components of dissonance not modeled by this theory include critical band roughness as well as tonal context (e.g. an augmented second is more dissonant than a minor third even though both can be tuned to the same size, as in 12-ET).

For the $n$th iteration of the Farey diagram, the mediant between the $j$th element, $f_j=a_j/b_j$, and the next highest element:

$\frac{a_{j} + a_{j+1}}{b_j + b_{j+1}}$ (Note: The mediant of two ratios, $\tfrac{a}{b}$ and $\tfrac{c}{d}$, is $\tfrac{a+c}{b+d}$.)

is subtracted by the mediant between the element and the next lowest element:

$$\frac{a_{j-1} +a_j}{b_{j-1}+b_j}$$

From here, the process to compute harmonic entropy is as follows:
(a) compute the areas defined by the normal (Gaussian) bell curve on top, and the mediants on the sides
(b) normalize the sum of the areas to add to 1, such that each represents a probability
(c) calculate the entropy of that set of probabilities
See external links for a detailed description of the model of harmonic entropy.
