= Nico F. Declercq =

Belgian physicist (born 1975)

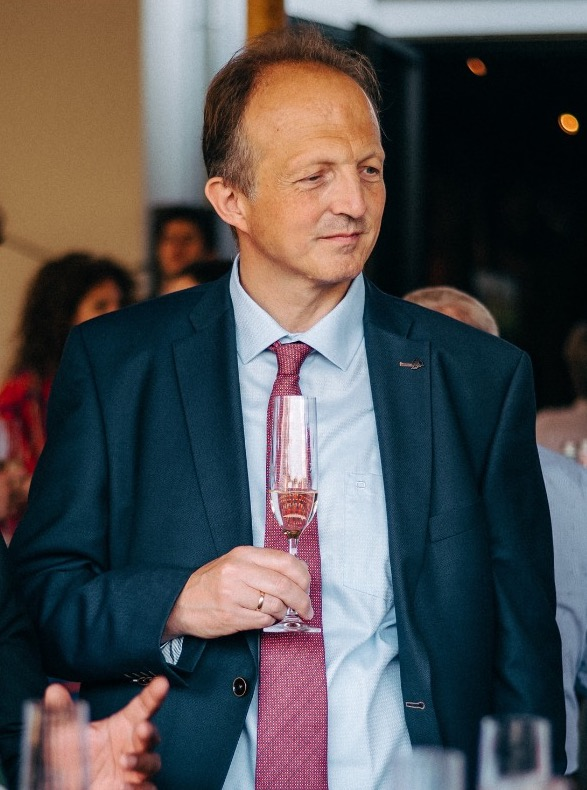
- Declercq in 2023
- Born: December 27, 1975 (age 50); Kortrijk, Belgium
- Other names: Ernesto de Montisalbi, Declercq de Patin, Desclergue
- Citizenship: Belgium
- Education: Catholic University of Leuven; Ghent University
- Known for: study of diffraction of acoustic waves and ultrasound waves
- Spouse: Shirani Olupathage de Silva
- Children: Benjamin J. H. Declercq, Anna-Laura F. M. Declercq, Lambert L. B. Declercq
- Awards: 2006 International Dennis Gabor Award; 2007 Early Career Award of the International Commission for Acoustics; 2022 Physics Professor Honoris Causa, University of Allahabad, India
- Scientific career
- Fields: Physics; Engineering Physics; Mechanical Engineering; History
- Workplaces: Georgia Institute of Technology
- Patrons: Agency for Innovation by Science and Technology (IWT, Belgium); National Fund for Scientific Research (FWO, Belgium); North Atlantic Treaty Organization
- Thesis: The interaction of complex harmonic elastic waves with periodically corrugated surfaces and with anisotropic viscoelastic and/or piezoelectric layered media (2005)
- Doctoral advisor: Oswald Leroy
- Other academic advisors: Mack A. Breazeale
- Website: declercq.gatech.edu

Nico Felicien Declercq (born 27 December 1975) is a Belgian physicist, mechanical engineer, poet, historian and philosopher. He is a professor at the Georgia Institute of Technology in Atlanta and Georgia Tech Europe in France. He specializes in ultrasonic nondestructive evaluation of materials, propagation of ultrasonic waves in highly complex materials, in acoustics, in theoretical and experimental linear and nonlinear ultrasonics, acousto-optics, medical physics and acoustic microscopy. He has investigated the acoustics of Chichen Itza and Epidaurus. He is also the author of a series of works on cosmology, general relativity,, the foundations of physics and, particularly, quantum mechanics, developing Trembling Spacetime Relativity Theory (TSRT). As a Ph.D. student, Declercq published 30 peer-reviewed articles in reputed scientific journals, including Annalen der Physik, and made 42 presentations (with papers in proceedings) at international congresses in his field. His work has been covered in Nature News, New Scientist, USA Today, The Economist, The Washington Post, Die Zeit, and Acoustics Today.

== Education, career and awards ==
Declercq received his BSc and MSc in physics (with a major in astrophysics) from the Katholieke Universiteit Leuven in 1996 and 2000, respectively, and received a PhD in engineering physics from Ghent University in 2005. He worked as a Belgian National Science Foundation (FWO Vlaanderen) postdoctoral fellow with Ghent University and has been a visiting scientist, supported by NATO, at the National Center for Physical Acoustics at the University of Mississippi, before joining Georgia Tech in 2006.

Declercq received the International Dennis Gabor Award from the NOVOFER Foundation of the Hungarian Academy of Sciences on December 21, 2006. He received the ICA Early Career Award "For outstanding contributions to ultrasonics, particularly for studies of propagation and diffraction of acoustic waves" from the International Commission for Acoustics in 2007. In 2024, he received the Raman-Charpak Award from the Indo-French Centre for the Promotion of Advanced Research, alongside collaborators from the University of Allahabad.

Declercq served as president (2013–2015) of the steering board of the International Congress on Ultrasonics, as well as president of their 2015 congress. He is an associate editor of the journal Acta Acustica united with Acustica, associate editor of the Journal of Nondestructive Evaluation, and founding editor-in-chief of Elsevier's Physics in Medicine. He serves on technical committees of the French Acoustical Society and is the Chair of the Ultrasonics Technical Committee of the European Acoustics Association. Declercq has received several Teaching Excellence Awards. In addition to his tenure as a full professor at Georgia Tech, he serves in a courtesy role as a full professor in the Doctoral School of the University of Lorraine in France.

== Professional Connections with France ==
Declercq is a Full Professor at the Georgia Institute of Technology in Atlanta and serves on doctoral committees worldwide, including France. Beyond his primary academic responsibilities, he advises PhD students at the Doctoral Schools of École Nationale Supérieure des Arts et Métiers and Université de Lorraine in France. Moreover, in France, Declercq has mentored PhD students even in cases where administrative constraints prevented his formal recognition as primary advisor. His academic involvement in France includes serving on Habilitation and Doctoral Committees at prestigious institutions such as Sorbonne Université, the Université de Lille, the Université de Franche-Comté, the Université du Maine, and the Université Polytechnique Hauts-de-France. He has also held various positions at multiple levels within the Société Française d'Acoustique. In addition, Declercq leads an ultrasonics laboratory at Georgia Tech Europe, which operates within the French National Centre for Scientific Research (CNRS).
