= Breazeale =

Breazeale is a surname. Notable people with the surname include:

- Daniel Breazeale (1945–2023), American philosopher
- Dominic Breazeale (born 1985), American boxer
- Jim Breazeale (1949–2025), American baseball player
- Mack A. Breazeale (1930–2009), American physicist
- Phanor Breazeale (1858–1934), American politician
