= D. Van Holliday =

American physicist (1940-2010)

Dale Vance Holliday (May 29, 1940 – February 4, 2010) was an American physicist and acoustician.

Born in Ennis, Texas, Holliday attended the University of Texas at Austin. He graduated with a B.S. and M.A. in Physics and did extensive theoretical and experimental research on the Mössbauer effect. He died in San Diego on February 4, 2010, after a period of illness.

Holliday became one of the first 100 employees of Tracor in 1962 and quickly became Director of Analysis and Applied Research in the Electronic Systems Division. In 1965 Holliday left Austin to develop the Tracor facility in San Diego and began his doctorate in applied physics at the University of California, San Diego.

In San Diego Holliday began his study in acoustics for which he is known. His study of transient flow in natural gas pipelines led to the publication of a textbook which is still used as a standard reference.

In the 1970s Holliday began testing a revolutionary technique for the detection and size measurement of zooplankton in thin layers involving multi-frequency backscattering. The technique developed and after twenty years became the established framework for research in the field.

In the early 1980s Holliday built the first prototype of the Tracor Acoustical Profiling System (TAPS) which has been described as decades ahead of its time by the Acoustical Society of America. TAPS is now the standard instrument for acoustical profiling of plankton in the sea.

Holliday published hundreds of papers on underwater acoustics and acoustical oceanography and given dozens of talks and symposia in several countries. In 2004 Holliday became only the third recipient of the Acoustical Society of America Silver Medal in Acoustical Oceanography, for "contributions to the study of marine life, from plankton to whales".

Holliday was awarded the Prix d'Excellence by the International Council for the Exploration of the Sea (ICES) in recognition of extraordinary contributions, fulfilling the ICES vision of scientific discovery, leadership, and applications that have had major influence on policy for sustained use and conservation of marine ecosystems. The Award was presented at the ICES Annual Science Conference on Monday September 22, 2008.

The research vessel R/V Dale Van Holliday is operated by the Southwest Fisheries Science Center of the NOAA Fisheries Service.

Holliday died on February 4, 2010, at the age of 69 from complications of heart surgery, which was in turn caused by complications from the scoliosis which he had battled his entire life.

The Acoustical Society of America organized a session in his memory during its 162nd Meeting, on October 31, 2011.

== Honors and Positions ==
- Prix d'Excellence - International Council for the Exploration of the Sea (2008)
- Silver Medal in acoustical oceanography - Acoustical Society of America (2004)
- Meritorious Public Service Award - Department of the Navy, Chief of Naval Research (2002)
- Founding Editorial Board - Limnology and Oceanography: Methods (2002)
- Steinbach Visiting Scholar - Woods Hole Oceanographic Institution (1987)
- Member of the US Delegation to the International Council for the Exploration of the Sea (1987)
- R/V D. V. Holliday - NOAA

== Sources ==
- Beamish, Richard J.; Rothschild, Brian J. (2009), The Future of Fisheries Science in North America, Springer, ISBN 978-1-4020-9209-1
- Biography, University of Massachusetts-Dartmouth
