= Robert K. Cunningham =

American computer scientist

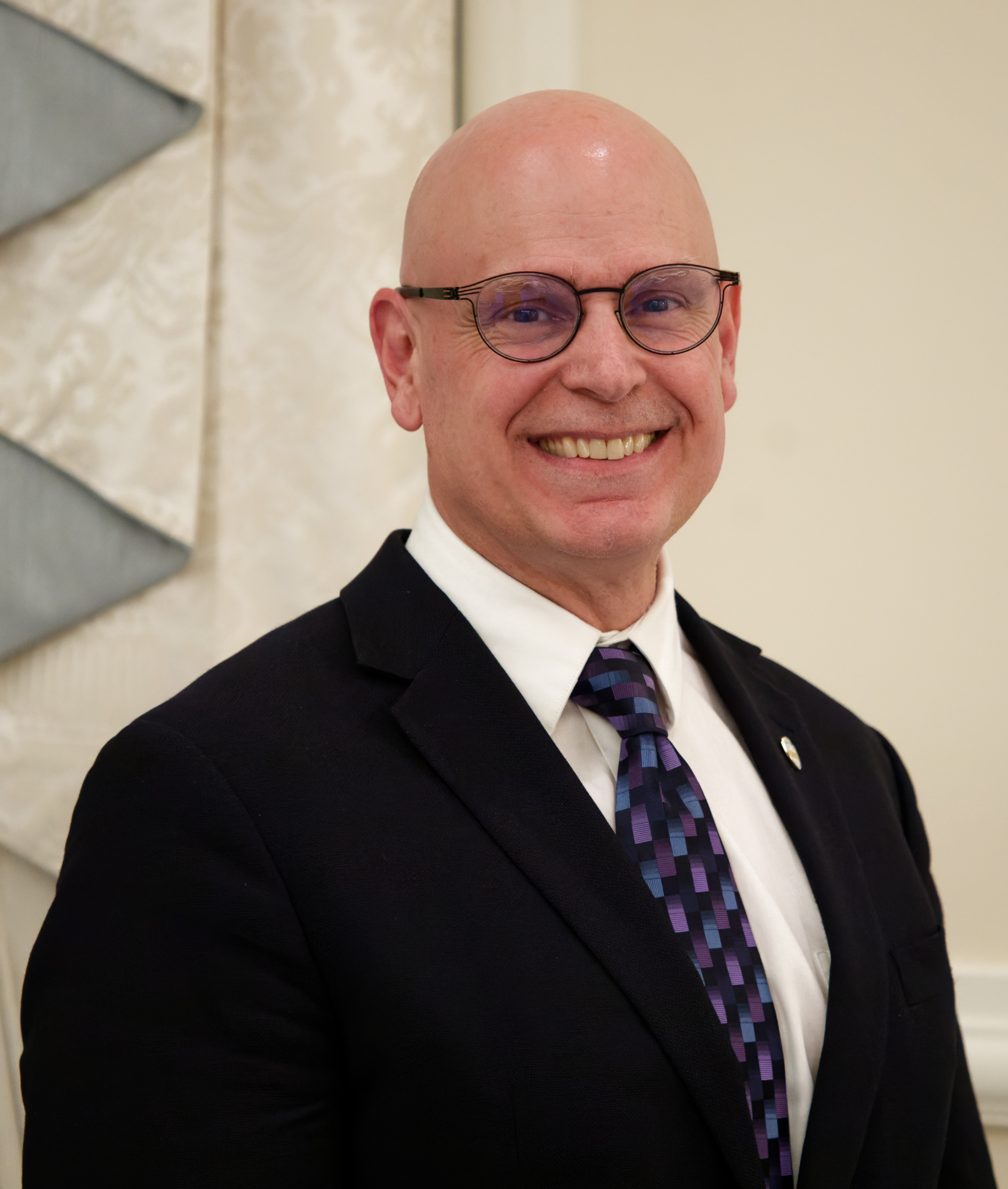
- Cunningham in 2024
- Education: Brown University; Boston University
- Spouse: Barbara Shinn-Cunningham
- Awards: Fellow, IEEE
- Scientific career
- Fields: computer security, machine learning, electrical engineering
- Workplaces: University of Pittsburgh; Carnegie Mellon University; University of Maryland; Massachusetts Institute of Technology

Robert K. Cunningham is an American computer scientist and engineer. In 2021 he became Vice Chancellor for Research Infrastructure at the University of Pittsburgh He is a fellow of the Institute of Electrical and Electronics Engineers., and a professor in the department of electrical and computer engineering and the department of informatics and networked systems, where he performs research on computer security and artificial intelligence.

== Education ==
He earned an Sc.B. in Electrical Engineering from Brown University, which he attended from 1981-1985. He studied visual processes as well as artificial intelligence in the former Department of Cognitive and Neural Systems of Boston University, where he earned his Ph.D.

== Career ==
He worked for twenty-five years at the MIT Lincoln Laboratory, principally on computer security. In this role, he participated on multiple national studies. He earned an MIT Excellence Award for "Bringing out the Best" in his staff in 2015 and an MIT Lincoln Laboratory Best Paper award in 2023 for his work developing a language for expressing adversary safety in cryptographic protocols.

From 2018 to 2021 he worked on cyber security and privacy, software engineering, and quantum computing at the Software Engineering Institute of Carnegie Mellon University. He was director of the Laboratory of Physical Science at the University of Maryland (2019–2020), where he contributed to several national strategy documents on computer architecture and quantum information science and engineering.

In 2021, he became Vice Chancellor for Research Infrastructure at the University of Pittsburgh, while maintaining connections to Carnegie Mellon University as a professor of cybersecurity. He holds several additional leadership positions, including executive director of the Pittsburgh Quantum Initiative.

He was made a fellow of the Institute of Electrical and Electronics Engineers in 2007. He has served as chair of the IEEE Cybersecurity Initiative.

According to Google Scholar he has an h-index of 30.

== Personal life ==
He is married to Barbara Shinn-Cunningham.

Robert is a member of the board of directors of Quantum Theatre.
