= Barbara Shinn-Cunningham =

Barbara G. Shinn-Cunningham
- Education: Brown University, Massachusetts Institute of Technology
- Spouse: Robert Kevin Cunningham
- Awards: ASA Silver Medal, Society for Neuroscience Bernice Grafstein Award, Acoustical Society of America Mentorship Award
- Scientific career
- Fields: Auditory neuroscience, auditory science, electrical engineering, cognitive neuroscience
- Workplaces: Carnegie Mellon University, Boston University
- Thesis: Adaptation to supernormal auditory localization cues in an auditory virtual environment (1994)
- Doctoral advisor: Nathaniel I. Durlach

Barbara Shinn-Cunningham is an American neuroscientist. She became the Glen de Vries Dean of the Mellon College of Science at Carnegie Mellon University (CMU) in 2025. Prior to this, she served as the founding director of CMU's Neuroscience Institute. At CMU, she is Professor of Auditory Neuroscience with appointments in the Neuroscience Institute, Psychology, Electrical and Computer Engineering, and Biomedical Engineering.

== Education ==
Shinn-Cunningham attended Brown University as an undergraduate, where she earned an Sc.B. in Electrical Engineering. She earned both her master's degree and Ph.D. from the Massachusetts Institute of Technology in Electrical and Computer Engineering.

== Career ==
Prior to moving to Carnegie Mellon, where Shinn-Cunningham runs the Laboratory in Multisensory Neuroscience, Shinn-Cunningham was a professor of Biomedical Engineering at Boston University (BU). She worked at Bell Communications Research, MIT Lincoln Laboratory, and Sensimetrics before joining the faculty at BU. She is an auditory neuroscientist best known for her work on attention and the cocktail party problem, sound localization, and the effects of room acoustics and reverberation on hearing.

Shinn-Cunningham's lab uses a range of techniques to understand neural coding and perception, including psychoacoustics, cortical electroencephalography and magnetoencephalography, functional near-infrared spectroscopy, pupillometry, comparative neuroscience, and computational modeling. She also collaborates with researchers conducting functional magnetic resonance imaging and neurophysiology. She is particularly interested in how sensory and cognitive processes work together to allow people to understand overlapping conversations.

She has held numerous leadership positions in professional organizations, including as President and as Vice President of the Acoustical Society of America, Treasurer and Member of Council of the Association for Research in Otolaryngology, and Chair of the AUD NIH study section. She regularly serves on advisory and review panels in academia and beyond. She has served as a Senior Editor for eLife and on the editorial boards of the Journal of the Association for Research in Otolaryngology, the Journal of Neurophysiology, and Auditory Perception and Cognition.

== Awards ==
Shinn-Cunningham is a fellow of the American Institute for Medical and Biological Engineering and the Acoustical Society of America (ASA). She has received fellowships from the Whitaker Foundation, the Alfred P Sloan Foundation and the National Security Science and Engineering Faculty Fellows program (now known as the Vannevar Bush Faculty Fellowship Program). She was the recipient of the biennial Mentorship Award from the Acoustical Society of America in 2013. She was a member of the Telluride Auditory Attention Team that received the 2021 Misha Mahowald Prize for Neuromorphic Engineering for their work to monitor auditory attentional selection through electroencephalography.

She was the eighth woman to receive any ASA Silver Medal and the first to receive the Helmholtz-Rayleigh Interdisciplinary Silver Medal (2019), which she was awarded in Psychological and Physiological Acoustics, Speech Communication, and Architectural Acoustics "for contributions to understanding the perceptual, cognitive, and neural bases of speech perception in complex acoustic environments."

In 2020, she was recognized by the Society for Neuroscience as a recipient of the Bernice Grafstein Award for Outstanding Accomplishments in Mentoring. In 2025, her undergraduate alma mater recognized her with the Brown Engineering Alumni Medal..

She is a Lifetime National Associate of the National Research Council of the National Academy of Sciences.

== Personal life ==
Shinn-Cunningham is married to Robert Kevin Cunningham, an engineer-scientist who has worked in machine learning, computational vision, and cybersecurity. They have two sons, Nick and Will, born in 1994 and 1996 respectively. She took up saber fencing as an adult. As a member of the 2019 US Veteran Team, she participated in the World Veteran Fencing Championships in Cairo, Egypt, where she was a member of the bronze medal-winning US Women's Saber Team and placed seventh in the individual Women Vet50 category. She is an avid oboist and English horn player.

== Selected publications ==
- Deng, Y, I Choi, B Shinn-Cunningham (2020). "Topographic specificity of alpha power during auditory spatial attention," Neuroimage, 207, 116360.
- Michalka SW, L Kong, ML Rosen, BG Shinn-Cunningham, DC Somers(2015). "Short-term memory for space and time flexibly recruit complementary sensory-biased frontal lobe attention networks," Neuron, 87, 882–892.
- Bharadwaj HM, S Verhulst, L Shaheen, MC Liberman, and BG Shinn-Cunningham (2014). "Cochlear neuropathy and the coding of supra-threshold sound," Frontiers in Systems Neuroscience, doi: 10.3389/fnsys.2014.00026.
- Ruggles D, H Bharadwaj, and BG Shinn-Cunningham (2012). "Why middle-aged listeners have trouble hearing in everyday settings," Current Biology, 22, 1417–1422.
- Ruggles D, H Bharadwaj, and BG Shinn-Cunningham (2011). "Normal hearing is not enough to guarantee robust encoding of suprathreshold features important in everyday communication", Proceedings of the National Academy of Sciences, 108, 15516–15521.
- Shinn-Cunningham, BG (2008). "Object-based auditory and visual attention," Trends in Cognitive Sciences, 12, 182–186.
- Shinn-Cunningham, B and V Best (2008). "Selective attention in normal and impaired hearing," Trends in Amplification [invited submission for special issue on Auditory Scene Analysis], 12, 283–299.
- Shinn-Cunningham BG, N Kopco, TJ Martin (2005). "Localizing nearby sound sources in a classroom: Binaural room impulse responses," Journal of the Acoustical Society of America," 117, 3100-3115.
- Durlach NI, CR Mason, G Kidd Jr, TL Arbogast, HS Colburn and BG Shinn-Cunningham (2003). "Note on informational masking," Journal of the Acoustical Society of America," 113, 2984–2987.
