= Evgenia Zabolotskaya =

Russian-American acoustic physicist (1935–2020)

Evgenia A. Zabolotskaya
- Born: 1935; Russia, Moscow
- Died: June 2, 2020 (aged 84–85); Sante Fe, New Mexico
- Known for: The Khokhlov–Zabolotskaya equation, the Khokhlov–Zabolotskaya–Kuznetsov equation
- Awards: USSR State Prize, Silver Medal of the Acoustical Society of America

Academic background
- Education: Moscow State University
- Doctoral advisor: Rem Khokhlov

Academic work
- Discipline: Physics
- Sub-discipline: Nonlinear acoustics
- Institutions: University of Texas at Austin; Russian Academy of Sciences; Moscow State University; Andreyev Acoustics Institute

Evgenia Andreevna Zabolotskaya (1935–2020) was a Russian-American physicist known for her contributions to nonlinear acoustics. The Khokhlov–Zabolotskaya equation and the Khokhlov–Zabolotskaya–Kuznetsov equation in nonlinear acoustics are named in part for her.

== Education and career ==
Zabolotskaya studied physics at Moscow State University, earning her bachelor's degree and then later returning in 1968 to complete her PhD under the supervision of Rem Khokhlov. After working at the Andreyev Acoustics Institute, she returned to Moscow State University in 1971, appointed to the biology department. In 1982, she moved again, to the General Physics Institute of the Russian Academy of Sciences.

After meeting and beginning to work with University of Texas at Austin mechanical engineering professors David Blackstock and Mark Hamilton, starting in 1982, Zabolotskaya moved to the University of Texas in 1991. From 1997 to 2000 she was on leave from the university to work at a start-up company in Virginia. She retired in 2015.

She died on June 2, 2020, in Santa Fe, New Mexico.

== Personal life ==
Zabolotoskaya Married to Yurii (Yura) Anatolevich Ilinskii in 1963, after they met at Moscow State University.

== Recognition ==
Zabolotskaya won the USSR State Prize in 1985. She is the 2017 winner of the Silver Medal in Physical Acoustics of the Acoustical Society of America.

She was honored by the Women in Acoustics Committee of the Acoustical Society of America shortly before her death and highlighted in an article on work-parenting harmony.
