= International Commission for Acoustics =

The purpose of the International Commission for Acoustics (ICA) is to promote international development and collaboration in all fields of acoustics including research, development, education, and standardisation.

The ICA is a Scientific Associate of the International Council for Science (ICSU), an Affiliated Commission of the International Union of Pure and Applied Physics (IUPAP), and an Affiliated Organization of the International Union of Theoretical and Applied Mechanics (IUTAM).

The ICA has a membership of over 40 national acoustical societies, and has affiliate members including the European Acoustics Association (EAA), the IberoAmerican Federation of Acoustics (FIA), the International Institute of Noise Control Engineering (I-INCE), the International Institute of Acoustics and Vibration (IIAV), the Western Pacific Acoustics Commission (WESPAC) and the International Congress on Ultrasonics (ICU).

The ICA convenes the triennial International Congresses on Acoustics, sponsors specialty symposia in acoustics, and coordinates the main international meetings within acoustics.

== History ==
The International Commission on Acoustics (ICA) was instituted in 1951 as a subcommittee to the International Union of Pure and Applied Physics (IUPAP). New Statutes were adopted by the International Commission on Acoustics in Antwerp 1996 March 31 and were approved by the IUPAP General Assembly in Uppsala Sweden 1996 September 20. An information letter explaining the proposed changes to the status of the commission was circulated to acoustical societies 1996 May 10. The new ICA held its first General Assembly 1998 June 25 during the 16th Congress in Seattle where the By-laws of the new organization were adopted by the Member Societies. The Commission then became known as the International Commission for Acoustics. The ICA has also applied to become an Affiliated Commission of the International Union of Theoretical and Applied Mechanics (IUTAM). A motion in favor of Affiliation was carried unanimously at the IUTAM General Assembly Meeting held at the University of Stuttgart 1998 August 28–30. The ICA became a Scientific Associate of the International Council of Scientific Unions ICSU in 2006.

== The International Congress on Acoustics ==
The International Congress on Acoustics is organized every three years by the International Commission for Acoustics. It is the world's biggest congress in the field of acoustics.

Dates and locations of past congresses of the International Commission for Acoustics:

- 1st ICA 1953 Delft, Netherlands
- 2nd ICA 1956 Cambridge, USA
- 3rd ICA 1959 Stuttgart, Germany
- 4th ICA 1962 Copenhagen, Denmark
- 5th ICA 1965 Liège, Belgium
- 6th ICA 1968 Tokyo, Japan
- 7th ICA 1971 Budapest, Hungary
- 8th ICA 1974 London, United Kingdom
- 9th ICA 1977 Madrid, Spain
- 10th ICA 1980 Sydney, Australia
- 11th ICA 1983 Paris, France
- 12th ICA 1986 Toronto, Canada
- 13th ICA 1989 Belgrade, Yugoslavia
- 14th ICA 1992 Beijing, China
- 15th ICA 1995 Trondheim, Norway
- 16th ICA 1998 Seattle, USA
- 17th ICA 2001 Rome, Italy
- 18th ICA 2004 Kyoto, Japan
- 19th ICA 2007 Madrid, Spain
- 20th ICA 2010 Sydney, Australia
- 21st ICA 2013 Montreal, Canada
- 22nd ICA 2016 Buenos Aires, Argentine
- 23rd ICA 2019 Aachen, Germany

== The ICA Early Career Award ==
The ICA Award, officially known as International Commission for Acoustics Early Career Award, or ICA Early Career Award, is a prize awarded at the Triennial International Congress on Acoustics (ICA) to an individual who is relatively early in his/her professional career, and who has been active in the affairs of Acoustics and has contributed substantially, through outstanding published papers, to the advancement of theoretical or applied acoustics or both. The award can be withheld if candidates do not meet the requirements of excellence but is normally awarded to one or more scientists in the same year. The Award consists of a Certificate with citation, an engraved Medal, and a Cash Prize. The prestige is comparable to that of the Fields Medal for Mathematics.

There exist other awards, German Acoustical Society Awards, Institute of Acoustics Society Awards and Acoustical Society of America Awards in acoustics which are usually focussing either on scientists from one country or in one particular field in acoustics or on members of one acoustical organization only and which are normally intended as lifetime achievement awards and/or awards for service to a particular society.

List of past recipients:

- 2016 Frank A. Russo, Ryerson University (now Toronto Metropolitan University), Canadian citizen
- 2013 Tapio Lokki, Aalto University School of Science, Finish citizen
- 2010 Torsten Dau, Technical University of Denmark, German citizen
- 2007 Nico F. Declercq, Georgia Institute of Technology, Belgian citizen
- 2004 Timothy Leighton, University of Southampton, UK citizen
- 2004 Oleg Sapozhnikov, Moscow State University, Russian citizen
