= Zwicker tone =

Short-term auditory illusion

A Zwicker tone is a short-term auditory illusion which resembles tinnitus (ringing of the ears). It was discovered in 1964 by Eberhard Zwicker at Bell Labs. The Zwicker tone can be described as follows: while listening to broadband noise ("white noise") with a spectral gap, if it is switched off, a faint tone lasting for several seconds can be heard. In the silence, most listeners hear a tone corresponding to the spectral gap. The pitch strength corresponds to the pitch strength of a pure tone of same pitch and sensation level.
