= John Backus (acoustician) =

Lithuanian American physicist and acoustician (1911–1988)

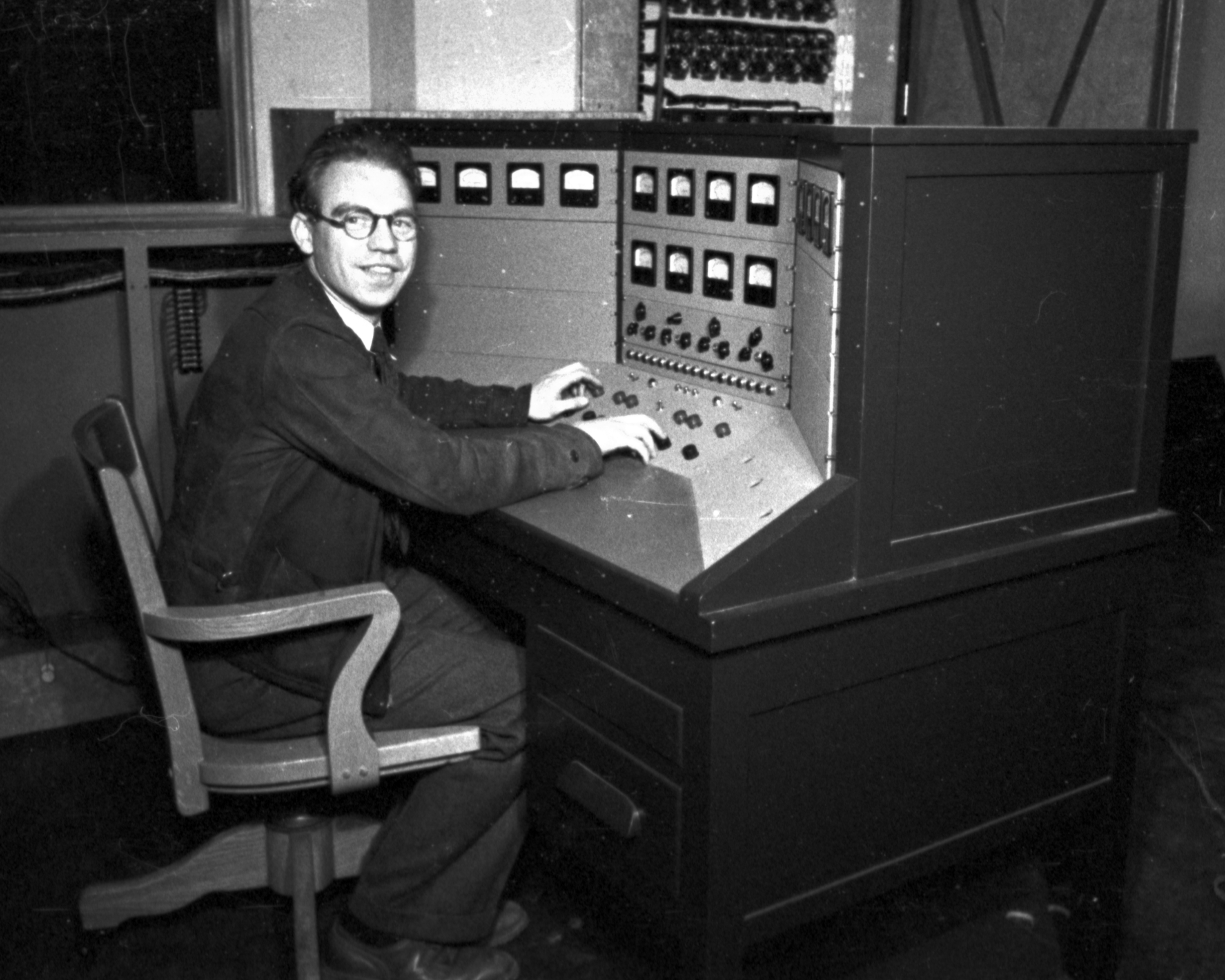
Backus in 1939 at the control panel for the Berkeley Lab 60-inch cyclotron

John Graham Backus (April 29, 1911 – October 28, 1988) was a Lithuanian American physicist and acoustician.

John Backus was born and raised in Portland, Oregon, where he studied at Reed College, receiving a BA in 1932. He went on to graduate studies at the University of California, Berkeley, where he did research in nuclear physics at the Radiation Laboratory under Ernest Lawrence. He received an MA in 1936, and a PhD in 1940. In 1945 he was appointed professor of physics at the University of Southern California, a post he retained until his retirement in 1980. During the early part of his career, his research focussed on gaseous discharges in strong magnetic fields. He was also a musician, trained as a performer on piano, bassoon, clarinet and other woodwinds and received the degree of MMus in conducting from the University of Southern California in 1959. In his later career he turned increasingly to the study of musical acoustics, particularly those of wind instruments and organ pipes. In 1969 he published The Acoustical Foundations of Music, a book which became a standard text for introductory courses in musical acoustics. A second edition appeared in 1977. He received the Silver Medal of the Acoustical Society of America in 1986. Backus died in Los Angeles in 1988.

In addition to music and physics, Backus was also a highly skilled mountaineer. The Sierra Club's Hundred Peaks Section List contains approximately 275 summits, and Backus was the first person to ascend every mountain on the list six times. He was also the first person to lead every peak on the list, among his many hiking and climbing accomplishments.

== Works ==
- Backus, John (1969). The Acoustical Foundations of Music. New York: Norton. ISBN 0-393-09834-6. LCCN 68-54957.

== Sources ==
- Campbell, Murray. 2001. "Backus, John (Graham)". The New Grove Dictionary of Music and Musicians, edited by Stanley Sadie and John Tyrrell. London: Macmillan.
