= Hugh S. Knowles =

Hugh S. Knowles (September 23, 1904 – April 22, 1988) was an American acoustical engineer, inventor, and manufacturer in the hearing aids field who was born in Hynes, Iowa. He was the holder of more than 50 patents in acoustics and related fields.

In 1946, Knowles founded Knowles Electronics, one of the world's major manufacturers of microphones, especially for medical applications. The company is headquartered in Itasca, Illinois.

He was a Fellow and past president of the Audio Engineering Society and a Fellow, Silver Medal recipient, and president of the Acoustical Society of America and a Fellow of the Institute of Electrical and Electronics Engineers (IEEE). In 1978, he received the AES Gold Medal for his many significant contributions to the audio field. Knowles was elected into the National Academy of Engineering (NAE) in 1969.
