= Sheila E. Blumstein =

American linguist

Sheila Ellen Blumstein
- Born: 1944 (age 81–82)
- Occupations: Cognitive science; Linguistics; Psychology
- Known for: Neural basis of speech and language processing
- Office: Interim President of Brown University
- Predecessor: Gordon Gee
- Successor: Ruth Simmons
- Awards: Guggenheim Fellowship; Claude Pepper Award; Radcliffe Institute Fellowship; Susan Colver Rosenberger Medal; Honorary Doctorate (Brown University); Elected fellow of: Acoustical Society of America; American Academy of Arts and Sciences; American Philosophical Society; American Association for the Advancement of Science; Linguistic Society of America

Academic background
- Education: University of Rochester (BA); Harvard University (PhD)
- Thesis: (1970)

Sheila Ellen Blumstein (born 1944) is professor emerita of cognitive, linguistic and psychological sciences at Brown University, where she was the Albert D. Mead Professor of Cognitive, Linguistic and Psychological Sciences. Among other distinctions, she served as the interim president of Brown University from February 2000 until July 2001 after Gordon Gee departed and before Ruth Simmons took the position. Although Dr. Simmons is deemed the first female president of the university, Dr. Blumstein's portrait hangs in Sayles Hall along with those of past presidents.

== Education and academic career ==
Blumstein is a 1965 magna cum laude graduate in linguistics of the University of Rochester and she earned her Ph.D. in linguistics at Harvard University in 1970. She came to Brown as an assistant professor in linguistics in 1970, was promoted to associate professor in 1976, and became a professor in 1981. She was chairman of the Department of Linguistics from 1978–81, Chairman of the Department of Cognitive and Linguistic Sciences from 1986–87, in 1997, and from 1998 to 2000, and Associate Chair from 2008-2010. She has served as Dean of the College at Brown from 1987-1995, as Interim Provost in 1998, and as Interim President from February 2000 to July 2001.

Blumstein has published extensively on the neural basis of speech and language processing using both lesion-based and functional neuroimaging methods.

== Awards and distinctions ==
Blumstein has served as member of a number of scientific review panels and boards for the National Institutes of Health, the National Science Foundation, and the McDonnell Pew Program in Cognitive Neuroscience.

She has been the recipient of a number of honors and awards including a Guggenheim Fellowship, a Claude Pepper Award from the National Institutes of Health, a Radcliffe Institute Fellowship, and an Honorary Doctorate as well as the Susan Colver Rosenberger Medal, both from Brown University.

She has been elected fellow of the Acoustical Society of America, the American Academy of Arts and Sciences, the American Philosophical Society, the American Association for the Advancement of Science, and the Linguistic Society of America.
