= Rem Khokhlov =

Soviet physicist (1926–1977)

Rem Viktorovich Khokhlov
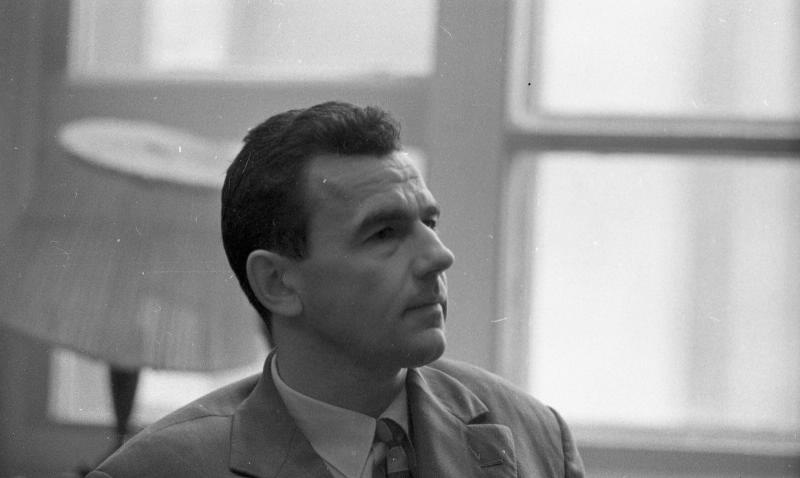
- Born: 15 July 1926; Livny, Orel region, USSR
- Died: 8 August 1977 (aged 51); Moscow, USSR
- Citizenship: Soviet Union
- Education: Moscow State University (1948)
- Known for: One of the founders of nonlinear optics
- Awards: Order of Lenin; Order of the Red Banner of Labor; Lenin Prize (1970); State Prize of the USSR (1985)
- Scientific career
- Fields: Radiophysics, Nonlinear optics
- Workplaces: Moscow State University
- Doctoral advisor: Pyotr Krasnushkin
- Doctoral students: Anatoly Sukhorukov, Vladimir Braginsky

Rem Viktorovich Khokhlov (Russian: Рем Викторович Хохлов; July 15, 1926, in Livny – August 8, 1977, in Moscow) was a Soviet physicist and university teacher, rector of Lomonosov Moscow State University, one of the founders of nonlinear optics.

== Biography ==
Khokhlov was born in the family of political officer and graduate of the Moscow Energetic Institute Viktor Khristoforovich Khokhlov and physicist Maria Yakovlevna. He graduated from a seven-year school in 1941 and worked in a car workshop during the Great Patriotic War. In 1944, he externally passed exams in high school and began to study at the Moscow Aviation Institute. In 1945, he moved to the Physics department at Moscow State University, where he spent his whole life. After graduating from university in 1948, he entered graduate school at the Department of Oscillation Physics. In 1952 he defended his thesis with the title of candidate of physical and mathematical sciences(PhD). With his investigations into vibrational physics he belonged to the third generation of the vibration physics school of Leonid I. Mandelstam and Nikolai D. Papaleksi. In 1959, he was sent to a one-year study visit to the United States at Stanford University. In 1962 he was awarded a doctorate (habilitation) in doctoral studies. Khokhlov organized together with S. A. Akhmanov, the first laboratory for nonlinear optics of the Soviet Union at the Lomonosov Moscow State University.

== Selected publications ==
- Krasnushkin P. E., Khokhlov R. V. Spatial beats in coupled wave guides. National Research Council of Canada, 1952.
- Akhmanov, S. A.; Khokhlov, R. V. (1972), Problems of nonlinear optics (Electromagnetic Waves in Nonlinear Dispersive Media), Gordon and Breach, p. 310
- Kaner, V.V., Rudenko, O.V., Khokhlov, R.V. Theory Of Nonlinear Oscillations In Acoustic Resonators. Sov Phys Acoust. 1977

== Honors ==
- Order of Lenin
- Order of the Red Banner of Labor
- Jubilee Medal "In Commemoration of the 100th Anniversary of the Birth of Vladimir Ilyich Lenin"
- Lenin Prize (1970)
- Foreign member of the Bulgarian Academy of Sciences
- State Prize of the USSR (1985)
- Namesake for the asteroid 3739 Rem (posthumously 1993)
