= Armen Sarvazyan =

Armenian-American biophysicist and entrepreneur (1939–2026)

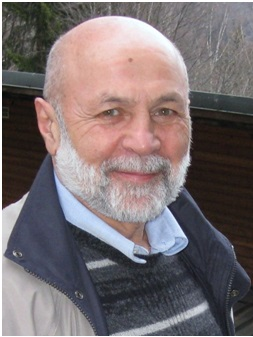
- Born: July 2, 1939; Yerevan, Armenia
- Died: May 28, 2026 (aged 86); Lambertville, New Jersey, U.S.
- Education: Moscow State University, Russia
- Known for: Invention of shear-wave elasticity imaging
- Scientific career
- Fields: Biophysics; Biomedical Engineering; Elastography
- Workplaces: Institute of Biophysics of the USSR Academy of Sciences; Rutgers University, NJ, USA; Artann Laboratories, NJ, USA

Armen Sarvazyan (July 2, 1939 – May 28, 2026) was an Armenian-American biophysicist and entrepreneur, serving as Chief Science Officer of Artann Laboratories. He is known for his work on the use of shear acoustic waves in medical imaging and diagnostics and the invention of shear-wave elasticity imaging (SWEI).

== Scientific career ==
Sarvazyan received the M.S., Ph.D., and D.Sc. degrees in 1964, 1969, and 1983, respectively, from the Moscow State University, Russia, and Institute of Biophysics of the USSR Academy of Sciences. Early in his career, in the 1960s and 1970s, working in the Institute of Biophysics of the USSR Academy of Sciences in Pushchino, he conducted pioneering studies of propagation of shear waves in soft tissues. A couple of decades later, Sarvazyan, in collaboration with academician Oleg Rudenko, proposed a new technology for medical imaging and diagnostics named shear-wave elasticity imaging.

In the 1970s and 1980s, in parallel with the studies of soft tissue biomechanics, he developed ultrasonic devices for the investigation of biomolecular interactions and obtained significant results on thermodynamic characteristics of water in the hydration shell of proteins and nucleic acids.

He continued these studies on the hydration of biopolymers at the Laboratory of Biomolecular Acoustics, which he organized at Rutgers University, NJ, US in 1992.

Beginning in the late 80s, a significant part of Sarvazyan's research activities were on the problems of elastography, an emerging technology of medical diagnostics. In 1991–1992, in collaboration with the University of Michigan, Ann Arbor, Sarvazyan conducted pioneering experiments on MRI and ultrasonic elastography. He published several review papers on biophysical basis of elasticity imaging, on soft tissue biomechanics and on acoustical radiation force, which is currently the key component in the majority of elasticity imaging technologies and devices.

During last decade, most of his research activities and publications were on the various medical applications a branch of elastography called mechanical imaging (a.k.a. tactile imaging), developed by Sarvazyan with Vladimir Egorov.

Sarvazyan has published over 200 research papers and book chapters, and edited 6 books. He has been the Principal Investigator of over 30 research projects funded by NIH, NASA, DoD and Bill and Melinda Gates Foundation. He has over 100 U.S. and international patents and invention certificates.

Sarvazyan is the co-founder of several companies specializing in elastography: ProUroCare Medical Inc. (Golden Valley, MN, 1999), Medical Tactile, Inc. (Los Angeles, CA, 2000), SuperSonic Imagine (Aix-en-Province, France, 2005) and Advanced Tactile Imaging, Inc. (Trenton, NJ, 2013). He is also the founder of Artann Laboratories Inc.

Sarvazyan died on May 28, 2026, at the age of 86.

== See also ==
- Elasticity
