= Mack A. Breazeale =

American physicist (1930–2009)

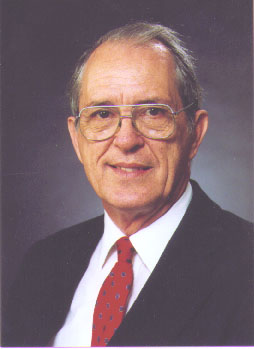
- Born: 15 August 1930; Leona Mines, Virginia
- Died: 14 September 2009 (aged 79); Oxford, Mississippi, US
- Education: Berea College; Missouri School of Mines; Michigan State University
- Spouse(s): Joanne O'Dell; Louise Hanna Scott Breazeale
- Awards: Silver medal from the Acoustical Society of America (1988)
- Scientific career
- Fields: Physics
- Workplaces: University of Tennessee; Michigan State University; University of Mississippi; National Center for Physical Acoustics
- Doctoral advisor: Egon A. Hiedemann
- Notable students: Laszlo Adler; Michael McPherson; Nico F. Declercq

Mack Alfred Breazeale (15 August 1930 – 14 September 2009) was an American physicist particularly known for his work in ultrasonics and physical acoustics. Breazeale is widely regarded as one of the leading acousticians of the 20th century, highly accomplished in both theory and experiment. When he died, he was a retired distinguished research professor and senior scientist at the National Center for Physical Acoustics at the University of Mississippi. Born in Leona Mines, Virginia, Breazeale grew up near Crossville, TN. Educated at Berea College, the Missouri School of Mines, and the Michigan State University, he was a tireless researcher and trained many others in the field of physics. Before his appointment at the National Center for Physical Acoustics, he was professor of physics at the University of Tennessee (1962-1995) and at Michigan State University (1957-1962). A longtime editor of the Journal of the Acoustical Society of America, he was a fellow of the Acoustical Society of America (ASA) and received its Silver Medal in 1988. He was a fellow of the Institute of electrical and Electronics Engineers and Great Britain's Institute of Acoustics, and had been a Fulbright Research Fellow in Stuttgart, Germany early in his career.

== Biography ==
Breazeale was a Distinguished Research Professor of Physics. Dr Breazeale received his Ph.D. from Michigan State University in 1957. He spent one year as Assistant Research Professor at Michigan State, then went to the University of Stuttgart, Germany, as a Fulbright Fellow. Upon his return to the United States, he spent two years as Assistant Research Professor at Michigan State University, then was appointed Associate Professor of Physics at the University of Tennessee, with a Consultantship at Oak Ridge National Laboratory. He was made full Professor of Physics at UT in 1967. Both at The University of Tennessee and at Oak Ridge National Laboratory he interacted with graduate students and now has 31 students for whom he has served as Major Professor. In 1987 he gave the President's lecture and was named Distinguished Lecturer by the IEEE UFFC Society and gave a total of 39 lectures in the US, China, Japan, Italy and Denmark. He received the silver medal in Physical Acoustics from the Acoustical Society of America in 1988. Breazeale has been at the University of Mississippi National Center for Physical Acoustics since 1988. Dr, Breazeale's specialties were nonlinear acoustics, acoustical parametric interactions, and acoustooptic interactions. He has served as consultant to Oak Ridge, Naval Research Lab., Leeds and Northrup Corp., McDonnell-Douglas Corp., Applications Research Corp., and Alcon Corp., on subjects related to nonlinear acoustics, optoacoustics, and acoustooptics. His present research involved these subjects applied to condensed matter physics.

== Some of Breazeale's PhD students ==
- Nico F. Declercq, co-advisor at Ghent University
