= Reinhard Lerch =

Electrical engineer

Reinhard Lerch is an electrical engineer at the University of Erlangen-Nuremberg in Erlangen, Bavaria. He was named a Fellow of the Institute of Electrical and Electronics Engineers (IEEE) in 2012 for his contributions to ultrasonic transducer technology and computer modeling of sensors and actuators.

Lerch is currently the dean of the technical department of the University of Erlangen-Nuremberg.
