= Ernst Terhardt =

German engineer and psychoacoustician (1934–2024)

- Born: 11 December 1934
- Died: 26 December 2024 (aged 90)
- Education: University of Stuttgart
- Engineering career
- Discipline: Electrical engineer

Ernst Terhardt (11 December 1934 – 26 December 2024) was a German engineer and psychoacoustician who made significant contributions in diverse areas of audio communication including pitch perception, music cognition, and Fourier transformation. He was professor in the area of acoustic communication at the Institute of Electroacoustics, Technical University of Munich, Germany. Terhardt died on 26 December 2024, at the age of 90.

== Education ==
Terhardt studied electrical engineering at the University of Stuttgart. His Master's thesis (Diplomarbeit) was entitled "Ein Funktionsmodell des Gehörs" (A functional model of hearing). His Dissertation was entitled "Beitrag zur Ermittlung der informationstragenden Merkmale von Schallen mit Hilfe der Hörempfindungen" (literally, "Contribution to determination of information-carrying characteristics of sounds with the help of auditory sensations"). Both projects were supervised by Eberhard Zwicker, with whom he founded the Institute for Electroacoustics, Technical University of Munich in 1967. Terhardt's Habilitation thesis (1972) was entitled "Ein Funktionsschema der Tonhöhenwahrnehmung von Klängen" (A model of pitch perception in complex sounds).

== Pitch perception ==
According to Terhardt's theory of pitch perception, pitch perception can be divided into two separate stages: auditory spectral analysis and harmonic pitch pattern recognition. In the first stage, the inner ear (cochlea and basilar membrane) performs a running spectral analysis of the incoming signal. In the second stage of pitch perception, harmonic patterns among the spectral pitches are spontaneously recognized by the auditory system, in a process analogous to pattern recognition in vision.

== Acoustic communication ==
Terhardt's approach to acoustic communication is based on Karl Popper's theory of three worlds according to which reality is either physical, experiential (perception, sensations, emotions) or abstract (thoughts, knowledge, information, culture). Terhardt maintained that these three aspects of acoustic communication must be carefully separated before we empirically explore the relationships between them. In the physical world, we consider the physics of sound sources such as the voice and musical instruments; auditory environments including reflectors; electroacoustic systems such as microphones and loudspeakers; and the ear and brain, considered as a purely physical system. Sound is a signal that is analysed by the ear; to understand this process, we need foundations of signal processing. To understand auditory perception, we perform psychoacoustic experiments, which are generally about relationships between and among Popper's three worlds.

== See also ==
- Virtual pitch
- Ernst Terhardt's Homepage
