= Nonlinear acoustics =

Branch of physics and acoustics

Nonlinearity in ultrasonic wave propagation through tissue at larger amplitudes

Nonlinear acoustics (NLA) is a branch of physics and acoustics dealing with sound waves of sufficiently large amplitudes. Large amplitudes require using full systems of governing equations of fluid dynamics (for sound waves in liquids and gases) and elasticity (for sound waves in solids). These equations are generally nonlinear, and their traditional linearization is no longer possible. The solutions of these equations show that, due to the effects of nonlinearity, sound waves are being distorted as they travel.

== Introduction ==
A sound wave propagates through a material as a localized pressure change. Increasing the pressure of a gas or fluid increases its local temperature. The local speed of sound in a compressible material increases with temperature; as a result, the wave travels faster during the high pressure phase of the oscillation than during the lower pressure phase. This affects the wave's frequency structure; for example, in an initially plain sinusoidal wave of a single frequency, the peaks of the wave travel faster than the troughs, and the pulse becomes cumulatively more like a sawtooth wave. In other words, the wave distorts itself. In doing so, other frequency components are introduced, which can be described by the Fourier series. This phenomenon is characteristic of a nonlinear system, since a linear acoustic system responds only to the driving frequency. This always occurs but the effects of geometric spreading and of absorption usually overcome the self-distortion, so linear behavior usually prevails and nonlinear acoustic propagation occurs only for very large amplitudes and only near the source.

Additionally, waves of different amplitudes will generate different pressure gradients, contributing to the nonlinear effect.

== Physical analysis ==
The pressure changes within a medium cause the wave energy to transfer to higher harmonics. Since attenuation generally increases with frequency, a countereffect exists that changes the nature of the nonlinear effect over distance. To describe their level of nonlinearity, materials can be given a nonlinearity parameter, $B/A$. The values of $A$ and $B$ are the coefficients of the first and second order terms of the Taylor series expansion of the equation relating the material's pressure to its density. The Taylor series has more terms, and hence more coefficients (C, D, ...) but they are seldom used. Typical values for the nonlinearity parameter in biological mediums are shown in the following table.

Material	$B/A$
Blood	6.1
Brain	6.6
Fat	10
Liver	6.8
Muscle	7.4
Water	5.2
Monatomic Gas	0.67

In a liquid usually a modified coefficient is used known as $\beta = 1 + \frac{B}{2A}$.

== Mathematical model ==
=== Governing equations to derive Westervelt equation ===
Continuity:

$$\frac{\partial \rho}{\partial t} + \nabla \cdot (\rho \textbf{u}) = 0$$

Conservation of momentum:

$$\rho \left( \frac{\partial \textbf{u}}{\partial t} + \textbf{u} \cdot \nabla \textbf{u} \right) + \nabla p = (\lambda + 2 \mu) \nabla (\nabla \cdot \textbf{u})$$

with Taylor perturbation expansion on density:

$$\rho = \sum_0^\infty \varepsilon^i \rho_i$$

where ε is a small parameter, i.e. the perturbation parameter, the equation of state becomes:

$$p = \varepsilon \rho_1 c_0^2 \left( 1+ \varepsilon \frac{B}{2!A}\frac{\rho_1}{\rho_0} + O(\varepsilon^2) \right)$$

If the second term in the Taylor expansion of pressure is dropped, the viscous wave equation can be derived. If it is kept, the nonlinear term in pressure appears in the Westervelt equation.

=== Westervelt equation ===
The general wave equation that accounts for nonlinearity up to the second-order is given by the Westervelt equation

$$\, \nabla^{2} p - \frac{1}{c_{0}^{2}} \frac{\partial^{2} p}{\partial t^{2}} + \frac{\delta}{c_{0}^{4}} \frac{\partial^{3} p}{\partial t^{3}} = - \frac{\beta}{\rho_{0} c_{0}^{4}} \frac{\partial^{2} p^{2}}{\partial t^{2}}$$

where $p$ is the sound pressure, $c_0$ is the small signal sound speed, $\delta$ is the sound diffusivity, $\beta$ is the nonlinearity coefficient and $\rho_0$ is the ambient density.

The sound diffusivity is given by

$$\, \delta = \frac{1}{\rho_{0}} \left(\frac{4}{3}\mu+\mu_{B}\right) + \frac{k}{\rho_{0}} \left(\frac{1}{c_{v}} - \frac{1}{c_{p}}\right)$$

where $\mu$ is the shear viscosity, $\mu_{B}$ the bulk viscosity, $k$ the thermal conductivity, $c_{v}$ and $c_{p}$ the specific heat at constant volume and pressure respectively.

=== Burgers' equation ===
The Westervelt equation can be simplified to take a one-dimensional form with an assumption of strictly forward propagating waves and the use of a coordinate transformation to a retarded time frame:

$$\frac{\partial p}{\partial z} - \frac{\beta}{\rho_{0} c_{0}^{3}} p \frac{\partial p}{\partial \tau} = \frac{\delta}{2 c_{0}^{3}}\frac{\partial^{2} p}{\partial \tau^{2}}$$

where $\tau = t-z/c_0$ is retarded time. This corresponds to a viscous Burgers equation:

$$\frac{\partial y}{\partial t'} + y \frac{\partial y}{\partial x} = d \frac{\partial^2 y}{\partial x^2}$$

in the pressure field (y=p), with a mathematical "time variable":

$$t' = \frac z {c_0}$$

and with a "space variable":

$$x = - \frac{\rho_{0} c_{0}^{2}}{\beta} \tau$$

and a negative diffusion coefficient:

$$d = - \frac{\rho_{0} c_{0}}{2 \beta^2} \delta$$.

The Burgers' equation is the simplest equation that describes the combined effects of nonlinearity and losses on the propagation of progressive waves.

=== KZK equation ===
An augmentation to the Burgers equation that accounts for the combined effects of nonlinearity, diffraction, and absorption in directional sound beams is described by the Khokhlov–Zabolotskaya–Kuznetsov (KZK) equation, named after Rem Khokhlov, Evgenia Zabolotskaya, and V. P. Kuznetsov. Solutions to this equation are generally used to model nonlinear acoustics.

If the $z$ axis is in the direction of the sound beam path and the $(x,y)$ plane is perpendicular to that, the KZK equation can be written

$$\, \frac{\partial^2 p}{\partial z \partial \tau} = \frac{c_0}{2}\nabla^2_{\perp}p + \frac{\delta}{2c^3_0}\frac{\partial^3 p}{\partial \tau^3} + \frac{\beta}{2\rho_0 c^3_0}\frac{\partial^2 p^2}{\partial \tau^2}$$

The equation can be solved for a particular system using a finite difference scheme. Such solutions show how the sound beam distorts as it passes through a nonlinear medium.

== Common occurrences ==
=== Sonic boom ===
The nonlinear behavior of the atmosphere leads to change of the wave shape in a sonic boom. Generally, this makes the boom more 'sharp' or sudden, as the high-amplitude peak moves to the wavefront.

=== Acoustic levitation ===
Acoustic levitation would not be possible without nonlinear acoustic phenomena. The nonlinear effects are particularly evident due to the high-powered acoustic waves involved.

=== Ultrasonic waves ===
Because of their relatively high amplitude to wavelength ratio, ultrasonic waves commonly display nonlinear propagation behavior. For example, nonlinear acoustics is a field of interest for medical ultrasonography because it can be exploited to produce better image quality.

=== Musical acoustics ===
The physical behavior of musical acoustics is mainly nonlinear. Attempts are made to model their sound generation from physical modeling synthesis, emulating their sound from measurements of their nonlinearity.

=== Parametric arrays ===
A parametric array is a nonlinear transduction mechanism that generates narrow, nearly side lobe-free beams of low frequency sound, through the mixing and interaction of high-frequency sound waves. Applications are e.g. in underwater acoustics and audio.

== See also ==
- Cavitation
