= Journal of Nondestructive Evaluation =

Scientific journal

- Discipline: Nondestructive testing
- Language: English
- Edited by: John S. Popovics

Publication details
- History: 1980—present
- Publisher: Springer
- Frequency: Quarterly
- Impact factor: 2.4 (2024)

Standard abbreviations
- ISO 4: J. Nondestruct. Eval.

Indexing
- ISSN: 0195-9298 (print); 1573-4862 (web)

Links
- Journal homepage; Online access; Online archive

Journal of Nondestructive Evaluation is a peer-reviewed scientific journal published quarterly by Springer Science+Business Media. Established in 1980, it covers developments in nondestructive testing of materials, components, and biological objects. Its current editor-in-chief is John S. Popovics (University of Illinois Urbana-Champaign).

== Abstracting and indexing ==
The journal is abstracted and indexed in:

- Current Contents/Engineering, Computing & Technology
- Ei Compendex
- IBZ Online
- Inspec
- ProQuest databases
- Science Citation Index Expanded
- Scopus

According to the Journal Citation Reports, the journal has a 2024 impact factor of 2.4.
