= Oswald Leroy =

Belgian mathematician

Oswald Jozef Leroy
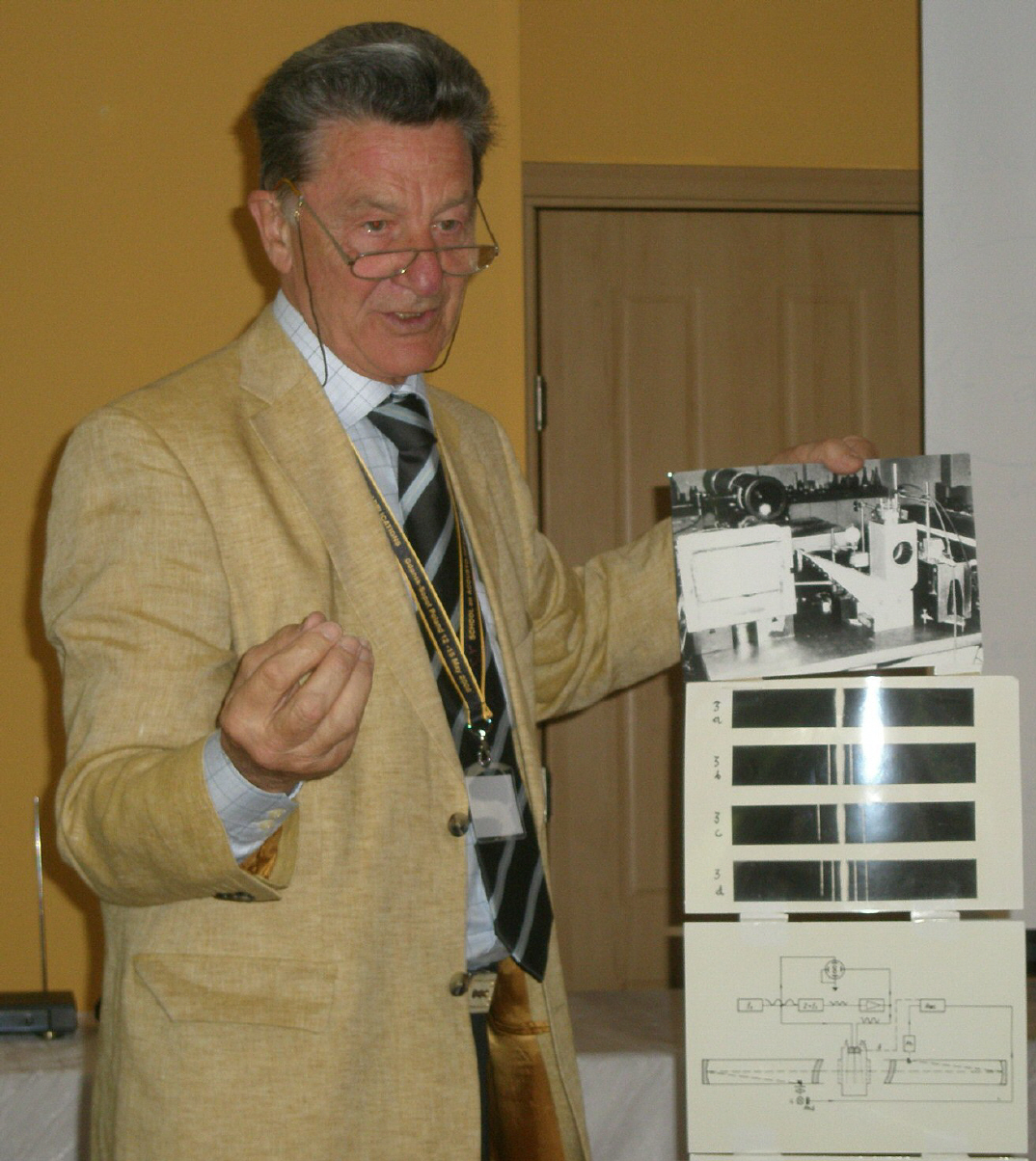
- Born: 16 May 1936; Passendale, Belgium
- Died: 7 September 2022 (aged 86); Ostend, Belgium
- Citizenship: Belgium
- Education: Ghent University
- Known for: acousto-optics theorist
- Awards: honorary doctorate from the University of Gdansk, ‘Médaille étrangère’ of the French Acoustical Society
- Scientific career
- Fields: mathematician
- Workplaces: Ghent University, KU Leuven
- Doctoral advisor: Robert A. Mertens

Oswald Jozef Leroy (16 May 1936 – 7 September 2022) was a Belgian mathematician known for his contributions to theoretical acousto-optics.

Leroy's biggest achievement was a theoretical study of the interaction of light with two adjacent ultrasonic beams under different conditions in terms of beam shape, frequency content and intensity. Understanding of this phenomenon was very important in the 1970s when new acousto-optic devices were developed (mainly due to novel developments in laser technology) that utilized adjacent ultrasonic beams. Such devices were being used in optical modulators, optical scanners, information processing , optical filtering and frequency-spectrum analysis. Before his contribution only the interaction of light with one ultrasonic beam was understood. Since then, acousto-optic devices have been used in telecommunication and military applications.

Leroy died at Ostend, Belgium in 2022.

== Career ==
Leroy received his PhD from Ghent University in the group of Robert A. Mertens for his thesis entitled Diffraction of light by ultrasound. He worked as an assistant professor at Ghent University from 1966 to 1972 and has been a tenured professor at the Catholic University of Leuven since 1972. New developments in laser physics formed the ground for collaborations between the team of Leroy and different other laboratories. He was a guest professor at the Paris Diderot University and Université de Bordeaux, the University of Tennessee and the Tokyo Institute of Technology. Furthermore, he has collaborated with the University of Gdansk, Georgetown University, and the University of Houston. He retired in 2001 and received the title of emeritus professor.

== Awards ==
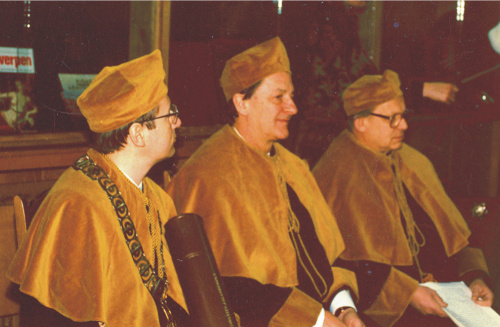
Oswald Leroy Doctor Honoris Causa University Gdansk 1991. From middle to right: Oswald Leroy, Antoni Sliwiski (University of Gdansk)

In 1991 Leroy was awarded an honorary doctorate from the University of Gdansk, for his contributions to theoretical acousto-optics and to celebrate a collaboration with the team of Antoni Sliwinski at the Institute of Physics of the University of Gdansk. In 2001 he has received the ‘Médaille étrangère’ of the French Acoustical Society.

== Selected articles ==
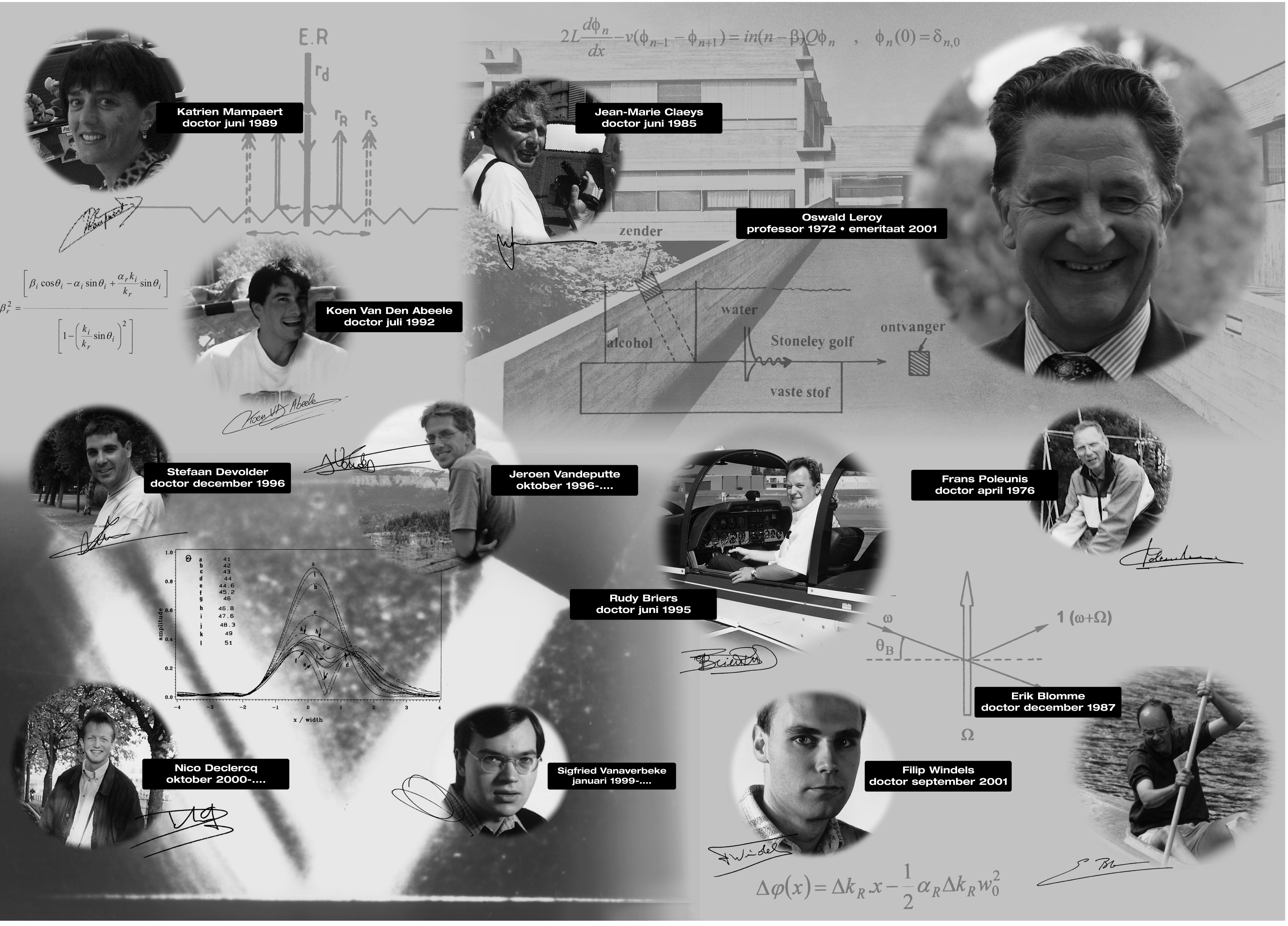
Team of PhD researchers of Oswald Leroy between 1972 and 2001; Picture made on the occasion of Oswald Leroy’s retirement in 2001. We can see Oswald Leroy with the main entrance of the Catholic University of Leuven Campus Kortrijk (KULAK) in the background as well as some mathematical formulas that have played a role in Leroy’s long career in acousto-optics. In addition a picture is shown, taken in 2001, of each member of his team.

- Leroy O., "Diffraction of light by two adjacent parallel ultrasonic-waves", journal of the acoustical society of America 51(1), 148, 1972
- Leroy O., "Theory of diffraction of light by ultrasonic-waves consisting of a fundamental tone and its first n − 1 harmonics", ultrasonics 10(4), 182, 1972
- Leroy O., "Diffraction of light by 2 adjacent parallel ultrasonic beams", acustica 29(5), 303–310, 1973
- Leroy O., "General symmetry properties of diffraction pattern in diffraction of light by parallel adjacent ultrasonic beams", Journal of sound and vibration 26(3), 389–393, 1973
- Leroy O., "Diffraction of light by 2 parallel adjacent ultrasonic-waves, having same wavelengths", journal of sound and vibration 32(2), 241–249, 1974
- Leroy, O., "TI light-diffraction caused by adjacent ultrasonics", IEEE transactions on sonics and ultrasonics su22(3), 233, 1975
- Poleunis F., Leroy O., "Diffraction of light by 2 adjacent parallel ultrasonic-waves, one being a fundamental tone and other its 2nd harmonic", Journal of sound and vibration, 58(4), 509–515, 1978
- Leroy O., Mertens R., "Diffraction of light by adjacent parallel ultrasonic-waves with arbitrary frequencies (noa-method)", acustica 26(2), 96, 1972
- W. Hereman, R. Mertens, F. Verheest, O. Leroy, J.M. Claeys, E. Blomme, "Interaction of light and ultrasound : Acoustoopics", Physicalia Magazine 6(4), 213–245, 1984.

== Books ==
- Physical Acoustics – Fundamentals and Applications, M.A. Breazeale O. Leroy (Eds.), Plenum US, 1991
- Advances in Acousto-Optics : 5th International Meeting of the European Acousto-Optical Club, Oswald Leroy (Edt.), Institute of Physics, 2001.
