= Radiophysics =

Study of radio waves and radiation

Radiophysics (also modern writing radio physics) is a branch of physics focused on the theoretical and experimental study of certain kinds of radiation, its emission, propagation and interaction with matter.

The term is used in the following major meanings:

- study of radio waves (the original area of research)
- study of radiation used in radiology
- study of other ranges of the spectrum of electromagnetic radiation in some specific applications

Among the main applications of radiophysics are radio communications, radiolocation, radio astronomy and radiology.

== Branches ==
- Classical radiophysics deals with radio wave communications and detection
- Quantum radiophysics (physics of lasers and masers; Nikolai Basov was the founder of quantum radiophysics in the Soviet Union)
- Statistical radiophysics
