= E. Glen Wever =

Ernest Glen Wever (October 16, 1902–September 4, 1991) was an American experimental psychologist known for his elucidation of hearing in vertebrates, ranging from the biomechanical functioning of the cochlea to the neural coding of sound and the evolutionary biology of hearing.

== Biography ==
Born in Benton, Illinois, Wever earned an M.A. in experimental psychology at Harvard in 1924, followed by a Ph.D. in 1926, working on visual perception. He was recruited to a faculty position at UC Berkeley but left after one year to join Princeton's psychology department, where he remained for his entire career, rising to full professor in 1941. It was at Berkeley, however, that he first began thinking about auditory science. He soon made contact with researchers at Bell Telephone Laboratories who were able to provide him with necessary electrical equipment: sound-level meters, amplifiers, and audio oscillators. At Princeton, in an early achievement of note, Wever and Charles Bray discovered that electrodes wrapped around the exposed auditory nerve of a (sedated) cat could transmit through a telephone wire an understandable replica of conversation in the room. Although Wever and Bray misinterpreted the signal as the action potential of the auditory nerve, the effect was real. This so-called cochlear microphonic is still used today as a measure of cochlear function. Wever and Bray subsequently recorded true action potentials, resulting in, among other discoveries, the now-accepted volley theory of frequency coding.

Wever's laboratory studied hearing mechanisms in organisms ranging from 1 gram lizards to 200 kilogram dolphins, including notable studies on turtles, snakes, and bats (which he caught himself). He was said to have little or no interest in social or other activities that might distract him from his research. A term as chair of Princeton's psychology department brought him no joy. Still, he was married to Suzanne Rinehart Wever, an accomplished musician. Wever's 1949 book, "Theory of Hearing" became a primary source of information for generations of acoustic investigators. He completed books on "The Reptile Ear" (1978) and "The Amphibian Ear" (1985), but never finished the third in the trilogy, which was to be on the fish ear.

== Awards and honors ==
Wever received many awards and honors, including the inaugural award of the Howard Crosby Warren Gold Medal from the Society of Experimental Psychologists, a prize later awarded to B.F. Skinner, Karl Lashley, and Georg von Békésy.
