= Eberhard Zwicker =

German scientist

Karl Eberhard Zwicker (15 January 1924, in Öhringen, Germany – 22 November 1990, in Icking) was a German acoustics scientist and full professor at the Technical University of Munich.

Zwicker studied physics and electrical engineering at the University of Stuttgart and was an assistant of Richard Feldtkeller. In 1967 he was appointed full professor of the newly founded Institute for Electro-Acoustics of the Technical University of Munich.

Zwicker developed a method for the computation of loudness, which became a German standard, DIN 45631.

Zwicker, together with Richard Feldtkeller, was author of the standard work for psychoacoustics Das Ohr als Nachrichtenempfänger. (The Ear as Message Receiver).

In 1964, at Bell Labs, he discovered the Zwicker tone auditory illusion.

== Literature ==
- Die Grenzen der Hörbarkeit der Amplituden- und Frequenzmodulation von Tönen und ihre Berücksichtigung in der Übertragungstechnik und der Hörphysiologie. Dissertation, Stuttgart 1952
- Die elementaren Grundlagen zur Bestimmung der Informationskapazität des Gehörs. In: Acustica. Band 6, 1956, S. 365–381, Habilitationsschrift, 1956
- with Richard Feldtkeller: Das Ohr als Nachrichtenempfänger. Hirzel, Stuttgart 1956; 2. Auflage, Hirzel, Stuttgart 1967
- with Ernst Terhardt als Herausgeber: Facts and models in hearing. Proceedings of the Symposium on Psychophysical Models and Physiological Facts in Hearing. Held at Tutzing, Oberbayern, April 22–26, 1974. Springer, Berlin [u.a.] 1974
- Psychoakustik. Springer, Berlin [u.a.] 1982, ISBN 3-540-11401-7
- with Manfred Zollner: Elektroakustik. Springer, Berlin [u.a.] 1984, ISBN 3-540-13509-X; 3. Springer, Berlin [u.a.] 1993, ISBN 3-540-56600-7
- with Hugo Fastl: Psychoacoustics. Facts and models. Springer, Berlin [u.a.] 1990, ISBN 3-540-52600-5; 3. Auflage, Springer, Berlin [u.a.] 2007, ISBN 978-3-540-23159-2
- Karl Eberhard Zwicker. 15.1.1924 – 22.11.1990. Feldpostbriefe aus dem Zweiten Weltkrieg an seine Eltern Wilhelm und Luise Zwicker und seinen Bruder Ulrich. Bis, Univ., Oldenburg 1993, ISBN 3-8142-0436-0
- DIN 45631, Berechnung des Lautstärkepegels aus dem Geräuschspektrum. Verfahren nach Eberhard Zwicker
- Herman A. O. Wilms: In Memoriam. Eberhard Zwicker. In: J. Audio Eng. Soc. Band 39, Nr. 3, März 1991, S. 199–200
