= Department of Electrical Engineering and Information Technology of TU Darmstadt =

University unit in Darmstadt, Germany

Department of Electrical Engineering and Information Technology
- Established: 1883
- Dean: Tran Quoc Khanh
- Students: around 2,400 (2018)
- Location: Darmstadt
- Website: www.etit.tu-darmstadt.de

Technical University of Darmstadt Campus City Centre
Technical University of Darmstadt Campus City Centre
1 Mensa (canteen)
2 Library
3 Audimax (largest lecture hall)
4 Altes Hauptgebäude (old main building)
5 Human Sciences
6 Mechanical Engineering
7 Center for Cybersecurity and Privacy Research
8 Mathematics
9 Physics
10 Computer Science
11 History and Social Sciences
12 Electrical Engineering and Information Technology

The Department of Electrical Engineering and Information Technology (etit) is a department of the Technische Universität Darmstadt. It was the first faculty of electrical engineering in the world and offered the first course of study in electrical engineering.

As of 2018, the Department of Electrical Engineering and Information Technology is one of the largest electrical engineering departments in Germany, with 29 professorships, approximately 250 scientific staff, and around 2,400 students across 10 study programs.

The history of the department is shaped by pioneers. Among the well-known graduates are for example John Tu, Kurt Heinrich Debus and Gerhard M. Sessler.

== History ==
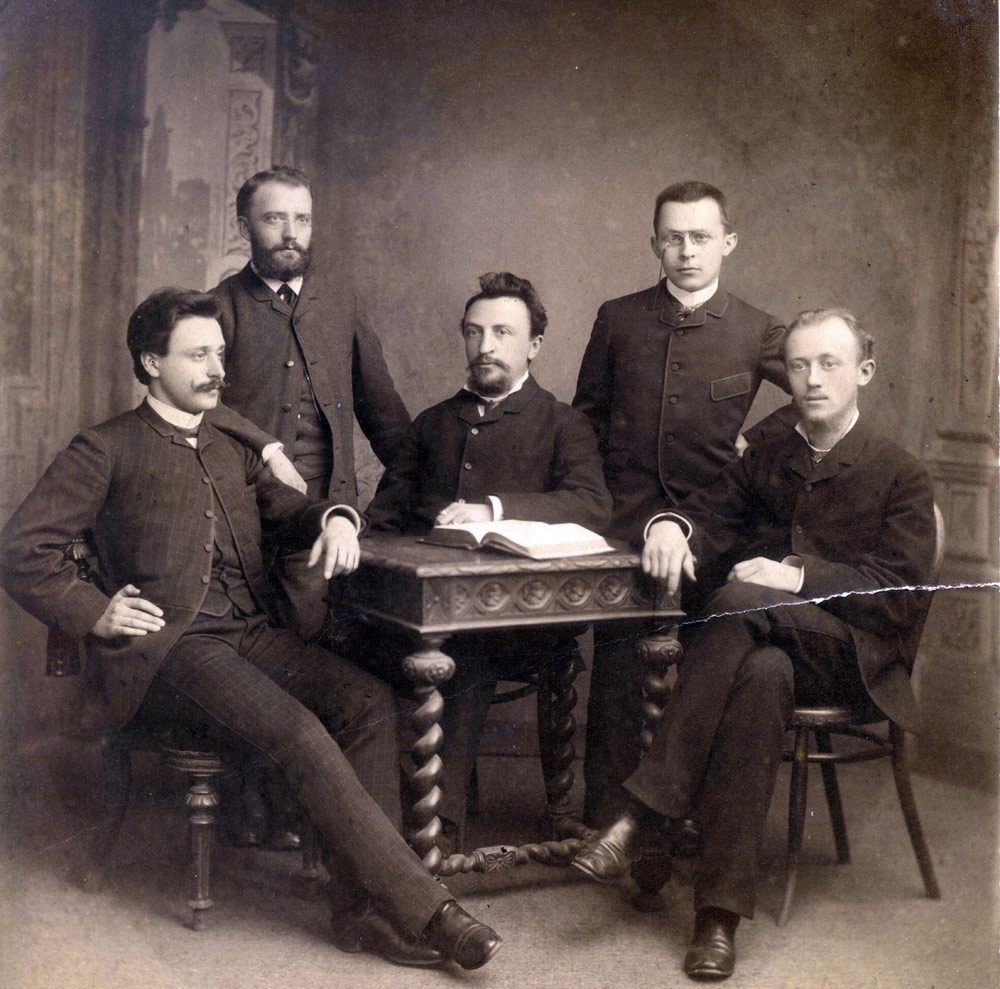
Erasmus Kittler (center) in the circle of his students at the TH Darmstadt, about 1886

In 1882, the electrical engineering pioneer and physicist Erasmus Kittler was appointed to the world's first chair of electrical engineering. One year later, the Faculty of Electrical Engineering was founded at the Technische Universität Darmstadt and the world's first degree course in electrical engineering was offered. Among Kittler's first students were Mikhail Dolivo-Dobrovolsky, the inventor of three-phase electric power and three-phase motor, which lead to the Second Industrial Revolution, and Carl Hering, known for Hering's experiment.

In 1899, the Electrotechnical Association was founded at the Technische Universität Darmstadt, from which many companies later emerged.

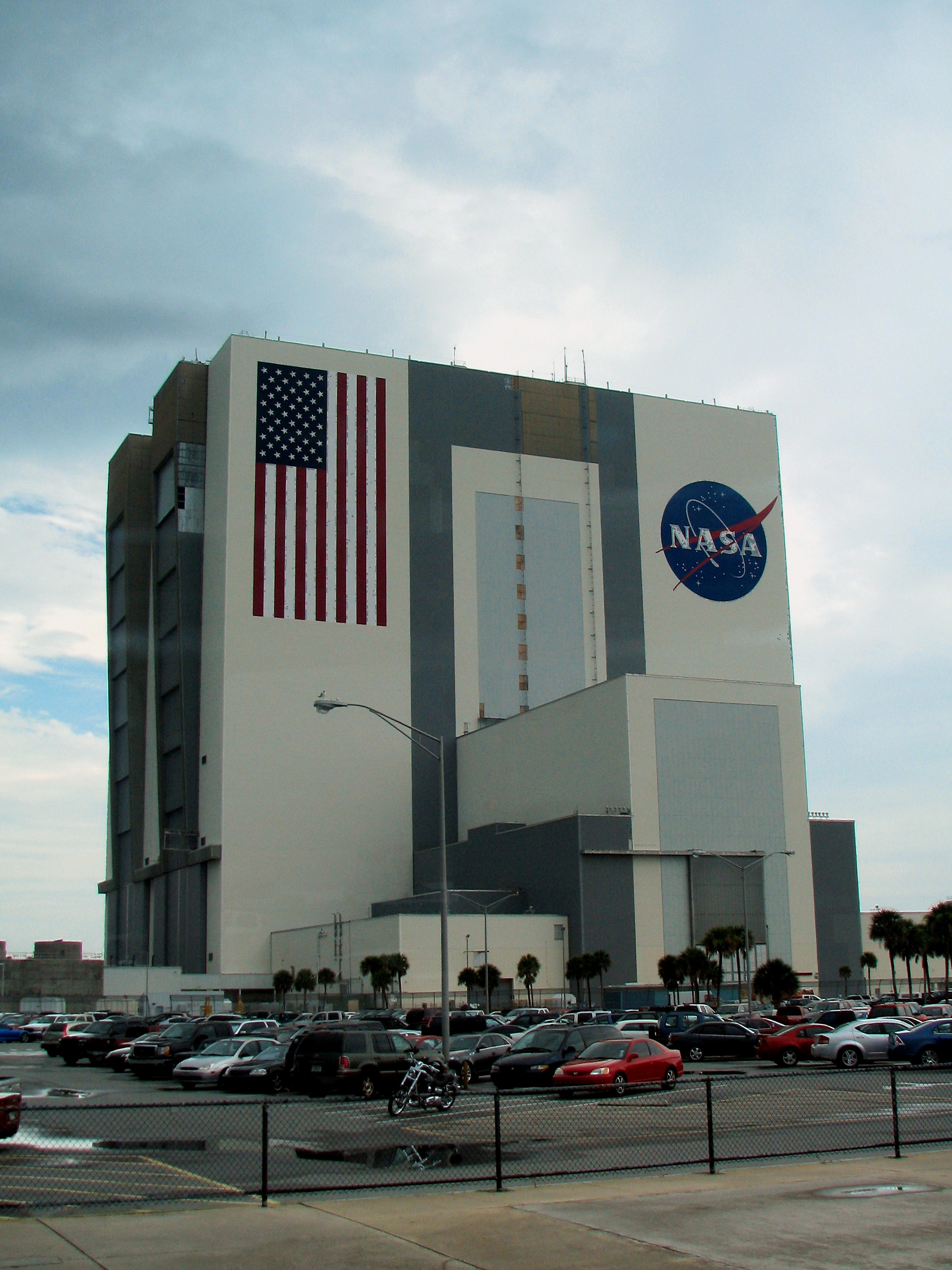
John F. Kennedy Space Center

In 1907, Rudolf Goldschmidt developed the Goldschmidt alternator, which enabled the first radio transmission line between the USA and Germany. Later, he invented several inventions together with Albert Einstein, including hearing aids and loudspeakers. They received the patent for the construction of a loudspeaker in 1933.

After Kittler retired from teaching in 1914, the Technische Universität Darmstadt awarded him an honorary doctorate and appointed Waldemar Petersen as his successor. Peterson established high voltage technology and invented a compensator for residual current in case of unintentional earth faults of an outer conductor, which is exhibited in the German Museum in Munich today. Later he became Director of AEG.

In 1930, Hans Busch was appointed professor at the newly established Institute of Communications Engineering. He founded modern electron optics, thus laying the foundations for the electron microscope.

Under the Nazi regime, the Faculty of Electrical Engineering and the Technische Universität Darmstadt were aligned with the National Socialist dictatorship from 1933 to 1945. Under the impressions of the Bombing of Darmstadt in World War II one year later, the first International Conference on Engineering Education was held at TU Darmstadt, at which all participants in research and teaching committed themselves solely to peaceful purposes.

In 1952, Karl Küpfmüller was appointed. He founded the system theory of electrical message transmission and thus made a significant contribution to the development of long-distance telephone traffic. In 1924 he established a relationship between the bandwidth and the duration of oscillation of signals, which later became known as Küpfmüller's uncertainty principle.

From 1962 until 1974, Kurt H. Debus was the first director of the John F. Kennedy Space Center. During this time he was responsible for the launch of the Apollo program including the six Moon landings, Apollo 11 to Apollo 17. Apollo 13 was aborted prematurely. Under his leadership the following missions were accomplished: 1961 Alan Shepard, first American in space, 1962 John Glenn, first American to orbit the Earth, 1969 Neil Armstrong, first man on the Moon, and the 1973 launch of the Skylab space laboratory.

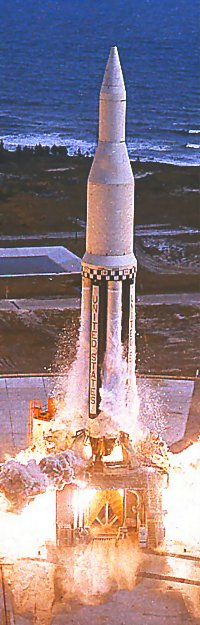
A Saturn I (SA-1)

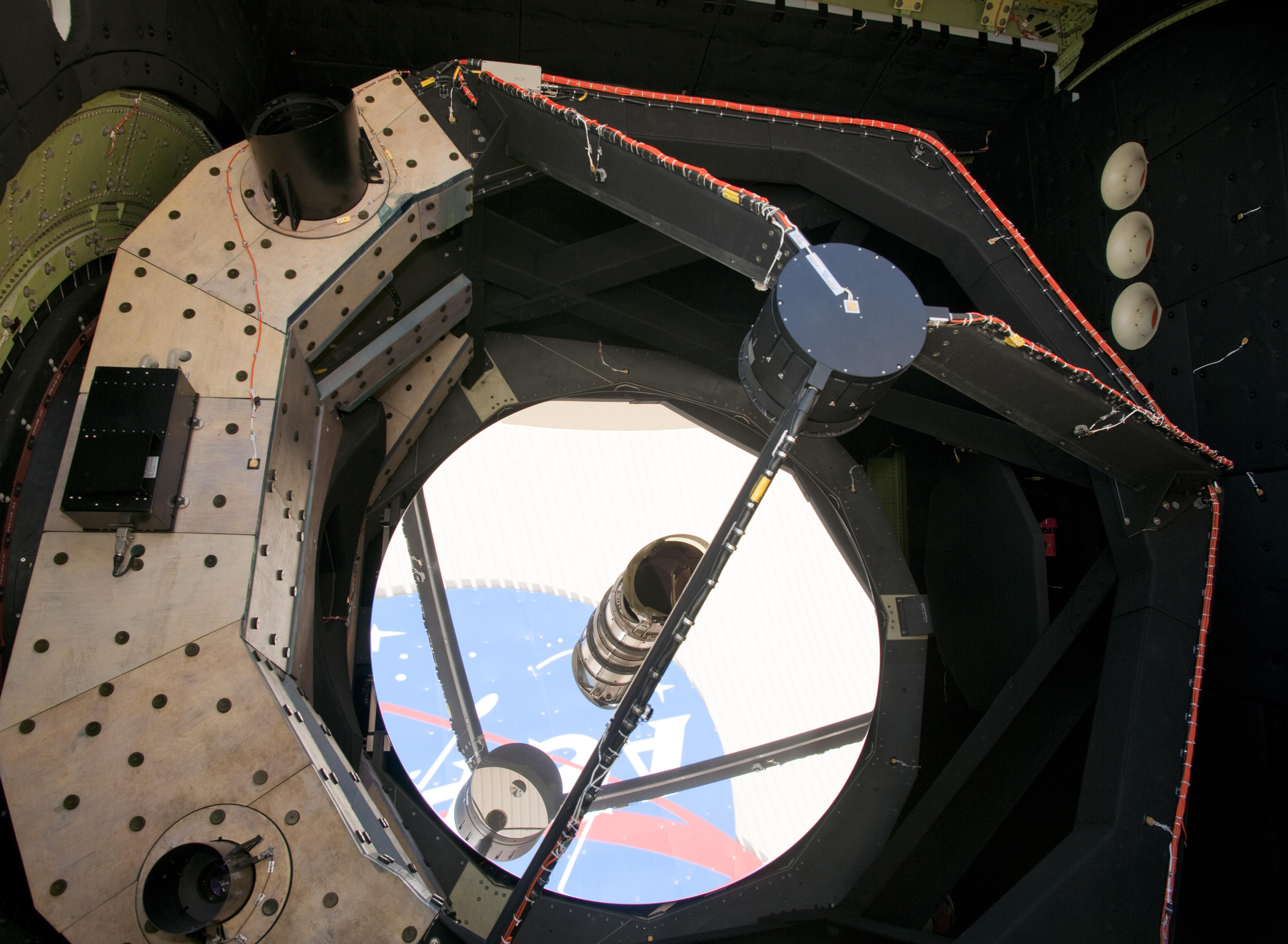
Stratospheric Observatory for Infrared Astronomy

Robert Piloty, who was appointed to the field of message processing in 1964, had a great influence on the development of data technology and the establishment of computer science as an independent discipline. In 1968, Robert Piloty and Winfried Oppelt initiated the first computer science course in Germany at the Faculty of Electrical Engineering.

In 1969, graduates of TH Darmstadt founded Software AG. Today it is one of the largest IT companies in Europe. Among the founders were Peter Pagé, electrical engineering graduate, and Peter Schnell, graduate of mathematics and physics. Schnell was chairman of Software AG for many years and today, with his Software AG Foundation, is one of the largest donors in Germany. One year later, billionaire John Tu completed his electrical engineering studies. He later founded Kingston Technology.

In 1971, the Faculty of Electrical Engineering was divided into three departments: Electrical Power Engineering, Communications Engineering and Control and Data Engineering.

In 1975, Gerhard Sessler, the developer of the foil electret microphone, was appointed to the Chair of Electroacoustics. He developed the silicon microphone at the department in 1983. Gerhard Sessler is included in the National Hall of Fame of the USA and received the Benjamin Franklin Medal in 2010.

In 1990, 1991 and 1992 the electric vehicle "Pinky" developed at TU Darmstadt won the Tour de Sol, the world championship for solar vehicles. Pinky is exhibited in the German Museum in Munich. The working group later developed into the Academic Solar Technology Group Akasol. Many companies came from Akasol, including the company of the same name Akasol AG. In 1996, the first chair for renewable energies in Germany was established at the university and is occupied by Thomas Hartkopf. Hartkopf and his team developed the energy systems of the solar houses, that won the Solar Decathlon in 2007 and 2009.

In 1998, Werner Langheinrich and Ottmar Kindl developed the technology for cameras in the Infrared Space Observatory (ISO). One year later, M. Anders, Egon Christian Andresen and Andreas Binder developed the linear power train of the Stratospheric Observatory for Infrared Astronomy (SOFIA).

In 2003, the Massachusetts Institute of Technology awarded Rolf Isermann, professor at TU Darmstadt, to the Top Ten of Emerging Technologies because his developments will have an enduring effect on the world.

In 2013, Germany's first chair for bio-inspired communication systems was established at the Department of Electrical Engineering and Information Technology and in 2017, the medical engineering course was established in cooperation with the Department of Medicine of the Goethe University Frankfurt.

== Research ==
The research profile of the etit department covers established research areas such as automation technology, microwave technology, communications technology, theoretical electrical engineering, data technology, microelectronics and electrical power engineering.

In addition, there are three main areas of research in the department:

=== Mechatronics, Automation & Sensors ===
The research focus is concerned with the investigation of the control of technical processes, the characterization and application of mechatronic systems and the necessary sensor technology for the acquisition of physical quantities. It includes the fields of automation technology, mechatronics, microtechnology and electromechanical systems, measurement and sensor technology as well as lighting technology. The research focus is characterized by cooperation with the Department of Mechanical Engineering and Semiconductor Technology in connection with microtechnically manufactured sensor systems.

=== Electrical Power Systems ===
The research focus Electrical Power Systems focuses on the generation, distribution and application of electrical energy.

=== Information & Communication Technology ===
The main research area Information & Communication Technology deals with system theory, the characterization of electronic devices and networks and all relevant applications in the field of information transmission and processing. It covers the fields of data technology, high-frequency and communications engineering as well as photonics.
