= Eduard Rhein Foundation =

German foundation

The Eduard Rhein Foundation was founded in 1976 in Hamburg (Germany) by Eduard Rhein. The goal of the foundation is to promote scientific research, learning, arts, and culture. This is done in particular by granting awards for outstanding achievements in research and/or development in the areas of radio, television and information technology.

== Awards and honors ==
The foundation grants the following awards and honors:

- Technology Award (30,000 euro)
- Cultural Award (10,000 euro)
- Ring of Honor (moonstone set in gold) for outstanding work which has been accomplished over a long period of time, the number of living bearers of rings is limited to ten

== Ring of Honor Recipients ==
- 1980 Vladimir K. Zworykin
- 1981 Walter Bruch
- 1982 Max Grundig
- 1983 Karl Holzamer
- 1984 Herbert von Karajan
- 1985 Hugh Greene
- 1986 Masaru Ibuka
- 1987 Werner Höfer
- 1988 Ray Dolby
- 1992 Rudolf Hell
- 1994 Count Lennart Bernadotte of Wisborg
- 1998 Heinz Zemanek
- 1999 Vladimir A. Kotelnikov
- 2000 Heinrich von Pierer
- 2001 Ernst-Ludwig Winnacker
- 2002 Hans-Jürgen Warnecke
- 2004 Hubert S. Markl
- 2007 Valentina Tereshkova
- 2008 Herbert Mataré
- 2012 Michael Sohlman
- 2015 Wolfgang Heckl
- 2020 Gerd Hirzinger

=== Award winners ===
1979 to 2006 award winners are listed in the German article.

2007:

- Technology Award: Prof. Dr. Dr. Gerhard Sessler for the design of electret transducers, the invention of the foil electret microphone (together with James West) and of the silicon condenser microphone (with D. Hohm).
- Cultural Award: Prof. Dr. Paul Dobrinski for the publication of scientific and technical works of young scientists.
- Ring of Honor: Dr. Dr. Valentina Tereshkova for her contributions in the area of crewed space flight.

2008

- Technology Award: Siegfried Dais and Uwe Kiencke for invention, international standardisation and propagation of the "Controller Area Network" (CAN), an open, reliable real-time communication system for embedded devices in automotive, medical and automation applications as well as in consumer goods, which today dominates the world market.
- Cultural Award: Norbert Lossau for brilliantly written science and technology related articles published in the newspaper "Die Welt". Over a sustained period of time his outstanding contributions are received by the readers as splendidly written, comprehensive in scope yet to read sources of information.
- Ring of Honor: Herbert F. Mataré for his invention of the solid state amplifier in 1948, performed independently and parallel to Bell Lab's transistor. Further, in recognition of his important contributions to information technology, solid-state physics and -manufacturing over a period of more than 60 years.

2009

- Technology Award: Dr. Martin Schadt Electro-optical core technologies for flat panel displays

2010

- Technology Award: Prof. Dr. Jens-Rainer Ohm and Prof. Dr. Thomas Wiegand Contributions to video coding and to the development of the H.264/AVC standard

2011

- Technology Award: Prof. Dr. Wolfgang Hilberg Invention of the radio clock

2012

- Technology Award: Prof. Dr. Bradford Parkinson Development of the Global Positioning System (GPS)
- Technology Award: Dov Moran for inventing the USB flash drive.

2013

- Technology Award: Ching W. Tang for inventing the first highly efficient organic light emitting diode and further contributions to the development of organic semiconductor devices.

2014

- Technology Award: Prof. Dr. Dr. Kees Schouhamer Immink for contributions to the theory and practice of channel codes that enable efficient and reliable optical recording, and creative contributions to digital recording technology.

2015

- Technology Award: Prof. Dr.-Ing. Dr. rer. nat. h.c. mult. Karlheinz Brandenburg, Dr.-Ing. Bernhard Grill and Prof. Dr.-Ing. Jürgen Herre for decisive contributions to the development and practical implementation of the mp3 audio coding technique.

2016

- Technology Award: Prof. Blake S. Wilson, Prof. Dipl-.Ing. Dr.tech. Erwin Hochmair and Dipl.-Ing. Dr. techn. Dr. med. Ingeborg J. Hochmair-Desoyer for the development and commercialization of the world’s first multi-channel microelectronic cochlear implant.

2017

- Technology Award: Prof. Dr.-Ing. Ernst D. Dickmanns for pioneering contributions to autonomic driving.

2018

- Technology Award: Dr. Rajiv Laroia for pioneering work on Flash OFDM as a Forerunner of Fourth-Generation Mobile Communications (4G).

2019

- Technology Award: Dr. Franz Laermer and Andrea Urban for the invention of the deep reactive ion etching process (Bosch Process), a key process for manufacturing semiconductor sensors.

2020

- Technology Award: Prof. Neal Koblitz, Ph.D. and Victor S. Miller, Ph.D. for the invention of cryptography based on elliptic curves.

2021

- Technology Award: Prof. Denis Le Bihan, MD, Ph.D. and Peter J. Basser, Ph.D. for the development of MRI diffusion tensor imaging, which is used for surgery and radiation planning, for research into neurological diseases associated with white matter changes, and for reconstruction of neural pathways in the brain (tractography).

2022

- Technology Award: Prof. Hideo Hosono, Ph.D. for the invention of metal oxide thin film transistors for display applications.

2023

- Technology Award: Prof. Gilles Brassard, Ph.D. and Charles H. Bennett, Ph.D. for the conception of the first key agreement protocol whose security is derived from the validity of quantum physics.
