= Zack Weisfeld =

Israeli entrepreneur

- צחי וייספלד
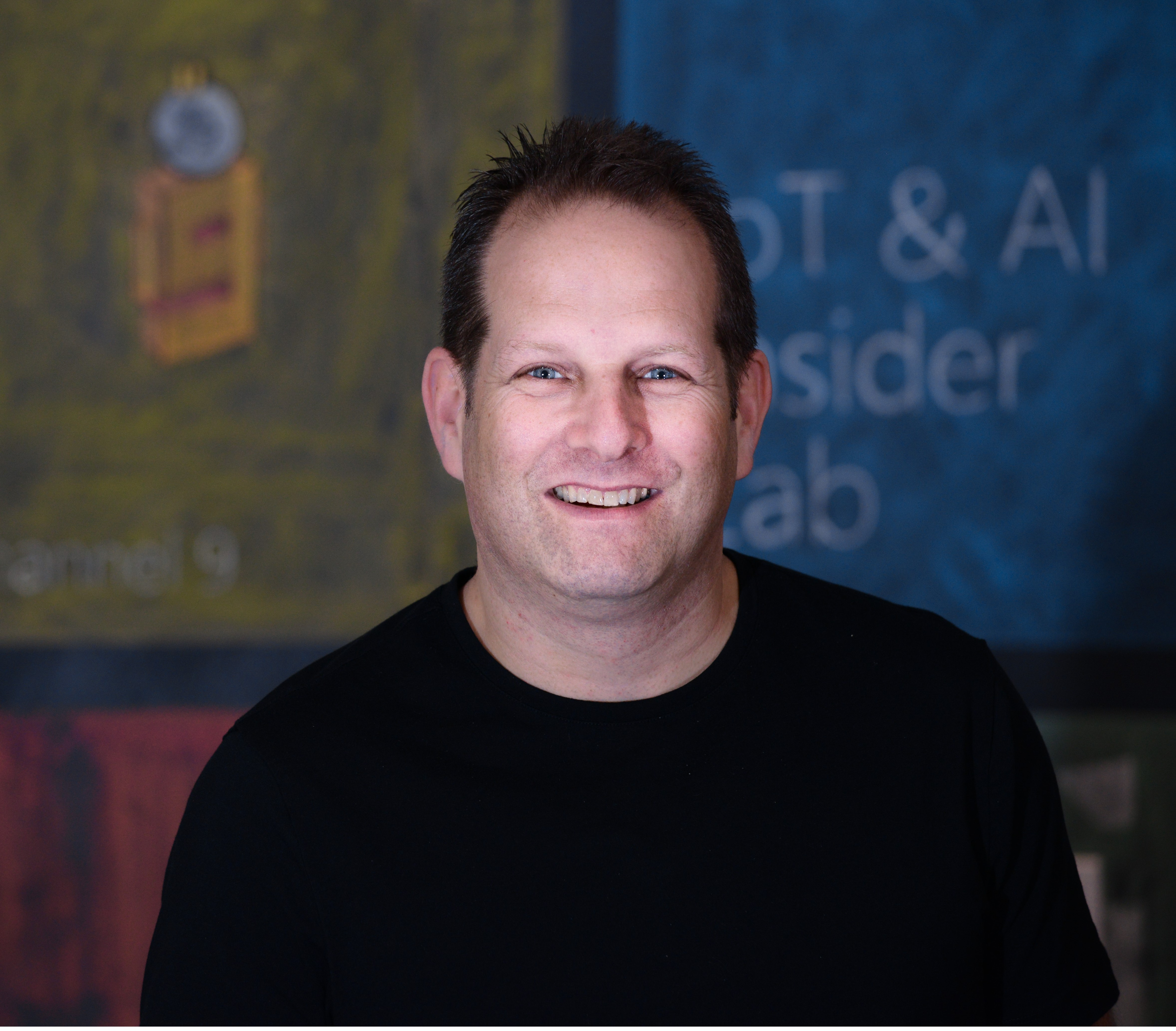
- Pronunciation: צַחִי וַייְסְפֵלְד
- Born: Tzahi Weisfeld; Holon, Israel
- Education: Bachelor of Arts degree in economics from Tel Aviv University, Business administration degree from Northwestern University
- Employer: Intel
- Title: General manager and head of Ignite: Intel for Startups program

Tzahi "Zack" Weisfeld (Hebrew: צחי וייספלד) is an Israeli serial entrepreneur. He is a Vice-president at Intel and the General manager of Ignite, Intel’s global start-up program. Weisfeld held several positions at Microsoft, including General Manager of Global Startups and a management member of Microsoft’s R&D Center in Israel.

== Biography ==
Tzahi Weisfeld was born in Israel and raised in Holon. His mother, Anita, is a nurse and managed the central region nursing services of Clalit Health services. She was awarded the Kaplan Award. His father owns a company for Metal and pipe thermographic imaging, water, oil and gas lines. Weisfeld attended Kiryat Sharet high school and served in the Israeli Defence Forces in Planning and Human Resources Department.

Weisfeld received his Bachelor of Arts degree in Economics from Tel Aviv University, and a Master of Business administration from Kellogg – Recanati business program from Tel-Aviv & Northwestern Universities.

Weisfeld is married and has three children.

== Business career ==
In 1991 Weisfeld joined JWT - Tamir Cohen ad agency to run NetKing, the second largest Israeli portal during that period. In 1998, Weisfeld joined Microsoft and was tapped to establish the Israeli version of the MSN portal which launched in 1999. In 2000, Weisfeld relocated to the United States with his family and managed the enterprise division of Commtouch. After the crash of the dot-com bubble, Weisfeld joined M-Systems as a Vice-president and Regional Manager for south and north America, until the company was acquired by SanDisk in 2006. In 2007, Weisfeld became Vice-president for Marketing and Strategy at Modu, the Israeli personal communications startup (IP sold to Google). After his departure in 2008, together with other Modu employees, he founded Mintigo, in 2019 Mintigo was acquired by Anaplan.

In 2010, Weisfeld returned to Microsoft as a senior director for Strategy and Business Development in the R&D Center in Israel and handled Microsoft’s activities with startups and universities. In 2012, he founded the Microsoft Ventures Accelerator program and established the company's first startup accelerator. The accelerator was located at the company’s research and development facility in Herzliya, and served as a model for accelerators in Seattle, London, Berlin, Bangalore, Shanghai, Beijing, and Sydney. During his tenure, Microsoft opened 9 accelerators. The model developed by Weisfeld is a four-month program that provides targeted assistance for start-ups in developing products and services for the global marketplace.

In June 2017, Weisfeld was appointed to lead Microsoft for Start Ups and managed cooperative efforts of Microsoft with startups across 110 countries. Under his role, Weisfeld also managed Microsoft Later Stage Accelerators as well as post acceleration programs and venture capital engagement. Thus included 200 accelerators in 47 different countries, and in collaboration with the company’s investment arm.

Weisfeld joined Intel in 2019 as the Intel Ignite General Manager, Intel’s accelerators division. He supervises the expansion of the Intel accelerators program and has helped launch branches in Munich and Austin, Texas. Intel Ignite is a 12-week program that offers guidance to early-stage startups, which receive access to technologies, business leaders, data and Intel's network of experts. Unlike other accelerators, the program does not require startups to front cash to participate.

=== Awards and recognition ===
In 2014, Business Insider listed Weisfeld as one of "The Most Influential Israelis In Tech Worldwide".

== See also ==
- Economy of Israel
