= Uncertainty principle (disambiguation) =

Heisenberg's uncertainty principle is a fundamental concept in quantum physics.

Uncertainty principle may also refer to:

== Science ==
- Entropic uncertainty, a concept in information theory
- Küpfmüller's uncertainty principle, a concept in electronic engineering formulated by Karl Küpfmüller
- Clinical equipoise, a principle in medical ethics

== Media ==
- The Uncertainty Principle (film), a 2002 Portuguese drama
- The Uncertainty Principle (audio drama), a production based on the British television series Doctor Who
- "The Uncertainty Principle", a season 1 episode of the TV series Joan of Arcadia
- "Uncertainty Principle" (Numbers), a 2005 episode of the TV series Numbers
- "The Uncertainty Principle" (The Spectacular Spider-Man), a 2008 episode of the TV series The Spectacular Spider-Man
- "The Uncertainty Principle", a 2009 episode of the TV series Holby City
- The Uncertainty Principle, a 1978 novel by Dmitri Bilenkin
- Uncertainty Principle, a 2003 novel by Gregorio Morales
- Uncertainty Principle, a British drone/funeral doom metal one-man band

== See also ==
- Uncertainty, a situation involving risky, ambiguous or unknown information
