= LogDog =

- Developer: LogDog Information Security Ltd
- Release: November 14, 2014
- Operating system: iOS, Android
- Type: Intrusion detection system
- License: Proprietary software
- Website: getlogdog.com

LogDog is a mobile Intrusion Detection System (IDS) app. It monitors various online accounts and scans multiple indicators that are associated with unauthorized access by taking into account a user’s routine across various devices and services. The app is currently available for Android and iOS.

== Overview ==
LogDog was developed by LogDog Information Security Ltd., which was founded in 2013 by Uri Brison, CEO of the Tel-Aviv, Israel-based company. Brison was head of user-experience at modu, and co-founded Smartype, an innovative keyboard.

The company raised $3.5 million in venture funding led by BRM Group, from TheTime VC, FirstTime Ventures, Maxfield Capital and Curious Minds Investments.

LogDog was initially released for Android in 2014, followed by iOS version in 2016.

== Features ==
LogDog protects users’ private online information against hacking by actively monitoring accounts for signs of suspicious activity. The services LogDog protects include: Gmail, Yahoo, Twitter, Facebook, Dropbox and Evernote. If a hacker attempts to gain access to any of the connected accounts, the user receives an alert that there is unauthorized access. It also provides an Inbox Detective service that scans the user's email account for any potential threats and assists in eliminating them.

LogDog has Android and iOS versions. Once a user installs the app on a supported device, it invites the user to add protection for each of the supported account types. The login data remains on the user own device, is never transmitted and vanishes when the user uninstall the app. LogDog's Privacy policy states that it does not collect User's passwords and does not store them on servers. It also supports two-factor authentication for Gmail and Facebook.

Techinasia magazine listed LogDog as one of the Israeli startups to follow closely in 2016.

== See also ==
- Intrusion Detection System
