= Tzahi =

Tzahi or Tzachi (Hebrew: צחי) is a Hebrew name, a diminutive of Yitzhak. Notable people with the name include:

- Tzahi Elihen
- Tzahi Grad, Israeli actor, screenwriter, and film director
- Tzachi Halevy
- Tzachi Hanegbi
- Tzahi Ilos
- Tzahi "Zack" Weisfeld
- Tzachi Zamir
