= Gerhard M. Sessler =

German inventor and scientist

Gerhard M. Sessler (born 15 February 1931 in Rosenfeld, Baden-Württemberg, Germany) is a German inventor and scientist. He is Professor emeritus at the Department of Electrical Engineering and Information Technology of the Technische Universität Darmstadt.

Together with James E. West, he invented the foil electret microphone at Bell Laboratories in 1962. Together with Dietmar Hohm, he invented the MEMS microphone, also known as the silicon microphone in 1983.

== Life ==
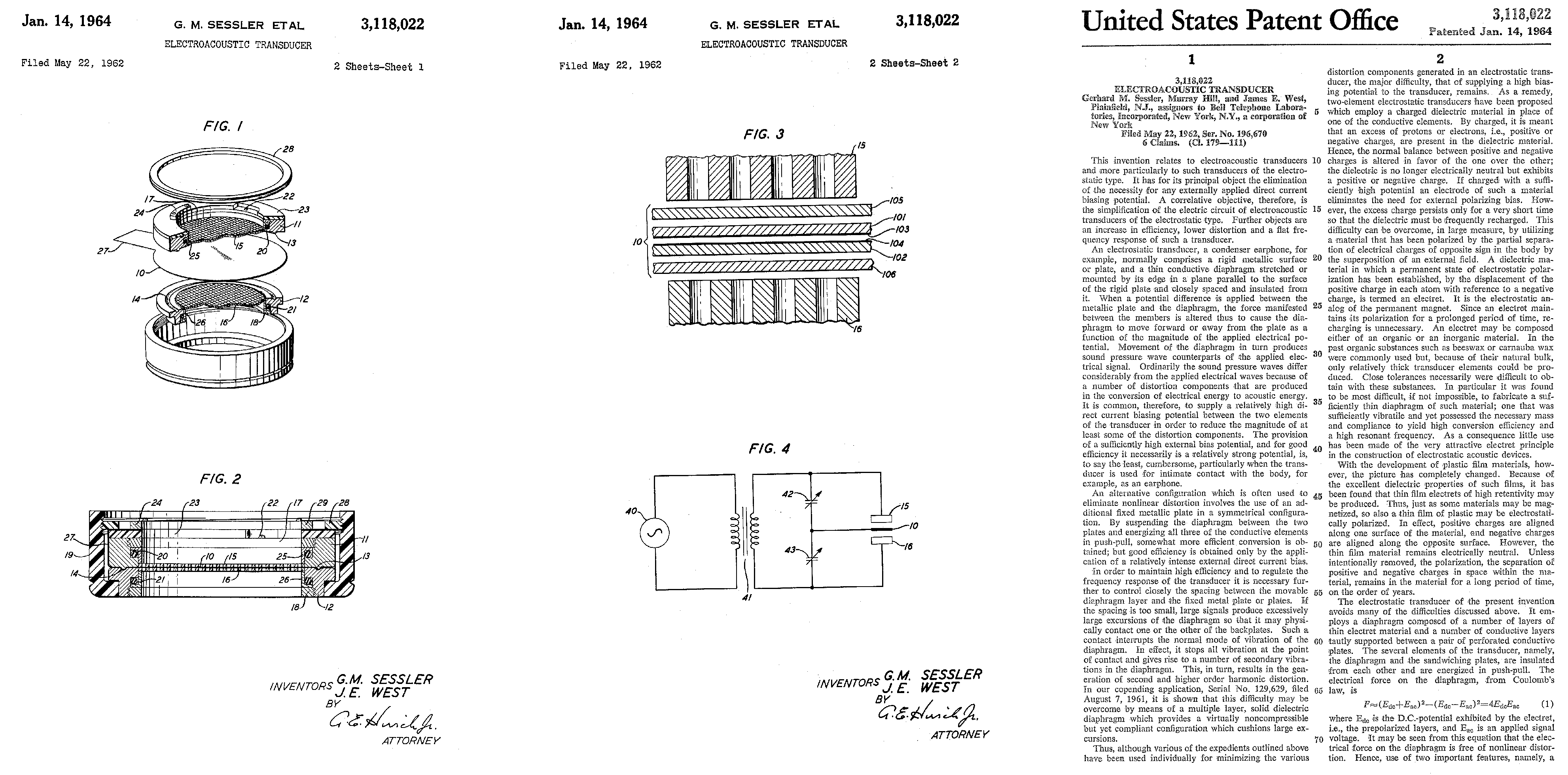
First patent on foil electret microphone by G. M. Sessler and J. E. West (pages 1 to 3)

From 1950 to 1959, Sessler studied physics at Universities of Freiburg, Munich, and Göttingen. He received his diploma in 1957 and his Ph.D. from the University of Göttingen in 1959. After working in the United States at Bell Labs until 1975, he returned to the academia in Germany. From 1975 to 2000, he worked as a professor of electrical engineering at the Department of Electrical Engineering and Information Technology of the Technische Universität Darmstadt where he invented the silicon microphone. In 1999, Sessler was named Professor emeritus at the same university.

He holds over 100 international patents, among them 18 US-patents. The first one, US 3,118,022, with James E. West, was issued on 14 January 1964.

Sessler is the author/editor of several books on electrets and acoustics. In 2014, together with Ning Xiang, he co-edited a memorial book on Manfred R. Schroeder published by Springer. Furthermore, he is well known for his over 300 scientific papers in prestigious international magazines and journals.

Gerhard Sessler was married to Renate Sessler (now deceased) and has three children: Cornelia, Christine and Gunther.

== Publications ==
- Sessler, Gerhard M. (1 November 2006). "Progress in electroacoustic transducer research". The Journal of the Acoustical Society of America. 120 (5_Supplement). Acoustical Society of America (ASA): 3100. Bibcode:2006ASAJ..120.3100S. doi:10.1121/1.4787543. ISSN 0001-4966.
- Sessler, Gerhard M. (21 January 2006). Electrets. Springer Science & Business Media. ISBN 978-3-540-70750-9.
- Sessler, G. M. (1 December 1981). "Piezoelectricity in polyvinylidenefluoride". The Journal of the Acoustical Society of America. 70 (6). Acoustical Society of America (ASA): 1596–1608. Bibcode:1981ASAJ...70.1596S. doi:10.1121/1.387225. ISSN 0001-4966.
- Bauer, Siegfried; Gerhard-Multhaupt, Reimund; Sessler, Gerhard M. (2004). "Ferroelectrets: Soft Electroactive Foams for Transducers". Physics Today. 57 (2). AIP Publishing: 37–43. Bibcode:2004PhT....57b..37B. doi:10.1063/1.1688068. ISSN 0031-9228.

== Awards ==
- Fellow of the Acoustical Society of America, 1964
- Fellow of the IEEE, 1976
- Fellow of the American Physical Society, 1991
- George R. Stibitz Trophy of AT&T, 1993
- Helmholtz-medal of the Deutsche Gesellschaft für Akustik, 1993
- Silver Helmholtz-Rayleigh-medal of the Acoustical Society of America, 1997
- Induction into the National Inventors Hall of Fame, 1999
- Technology Award of the Eduard Rhein Foundation, 2007
- honorary doctorate from the National Academy of Sciences of Belarus, 2010
- Benjamin Franklin Medal in Electrical Engineering of The Franklin Institute, with James E. West, 2010
- IEEE/RSE James Clerk Maxwell Medal, 2012
- Gold Medal of the Acoustical Society of America, 2015
