= Max Grundig =

German engineer (1908–1989)

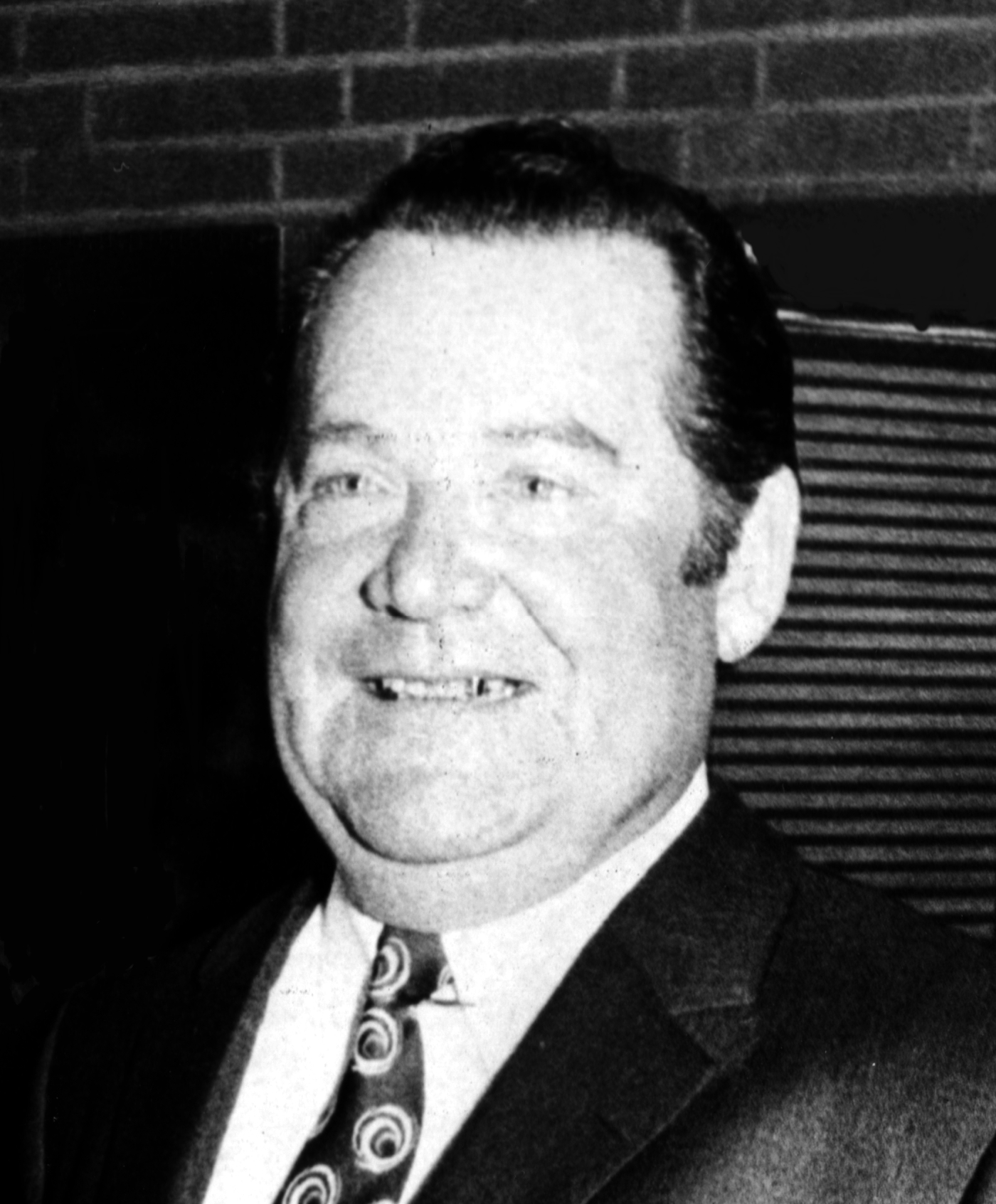
Grundig in 1970

Max Grundig (German pronunciation: [maks ˈɡʁʊndɪç]; 7 May 1908 – 8 December 1989) was the German founder of electronics company Grundig AG.

== Early life ==
Grundig was raised by his parents in Nuremberg where he delayed his final school exams (Abitur) and completed training as an electrician. Grundig's father died when he was 12 and his mother had to support her five children on a factory wage. Young Grundig started his working life as a plumber's apprentice.

== Career ==
In 1930, Grundig and a colleague opened a store selling radios under the name Fürth, Grundig & Wurzer (RVF), generating one million Reichsmark in sales by 1938. After World War II, business expanded with a successful range of consumer electronics. In 1972, the company became a corporation and was sold to Philips in 1984.

His company was one of the first to produce FM radios, cutting out static interference for clearer reception. In 1952, it was one of the first European companies to start producing television sets.

Grundig built his company up after World War II to become a market leader in home entertainment products and a symbol of West Germany's Wirtschaftswunder. It was only in the late 1970s that it began to lose some of its market share as it came under increasing pressure from lower-priced Japanese products, and in 1980 the company recorded its first losses.

Grundig's answer to the Asian competition was to form EURO, a common front of European manufacturers. It did not stave off the challenge, however, and the company was forced to close eleven plants and cut its workforce from 35,000 to 29,000 workers. In 1984, the Dutch Philips group bought out nearly a one-third share and took over the management.

Colleagues described Grundig as a workaholic who made decisions alone and took interest in the minutest details of his business.

"Order is holy to him; it means as much as half", was an official company description of him.

== Personal life ==
At the age of 21, Grundig married Berta Haag, daughter Inge was born 1930. After this birth the marriage was divorced. In 1938 he married soprano Anneliese Jürgensen. In 1981 he married his third wife Chantal Grundig. They had daughter Maria-Alexandra.

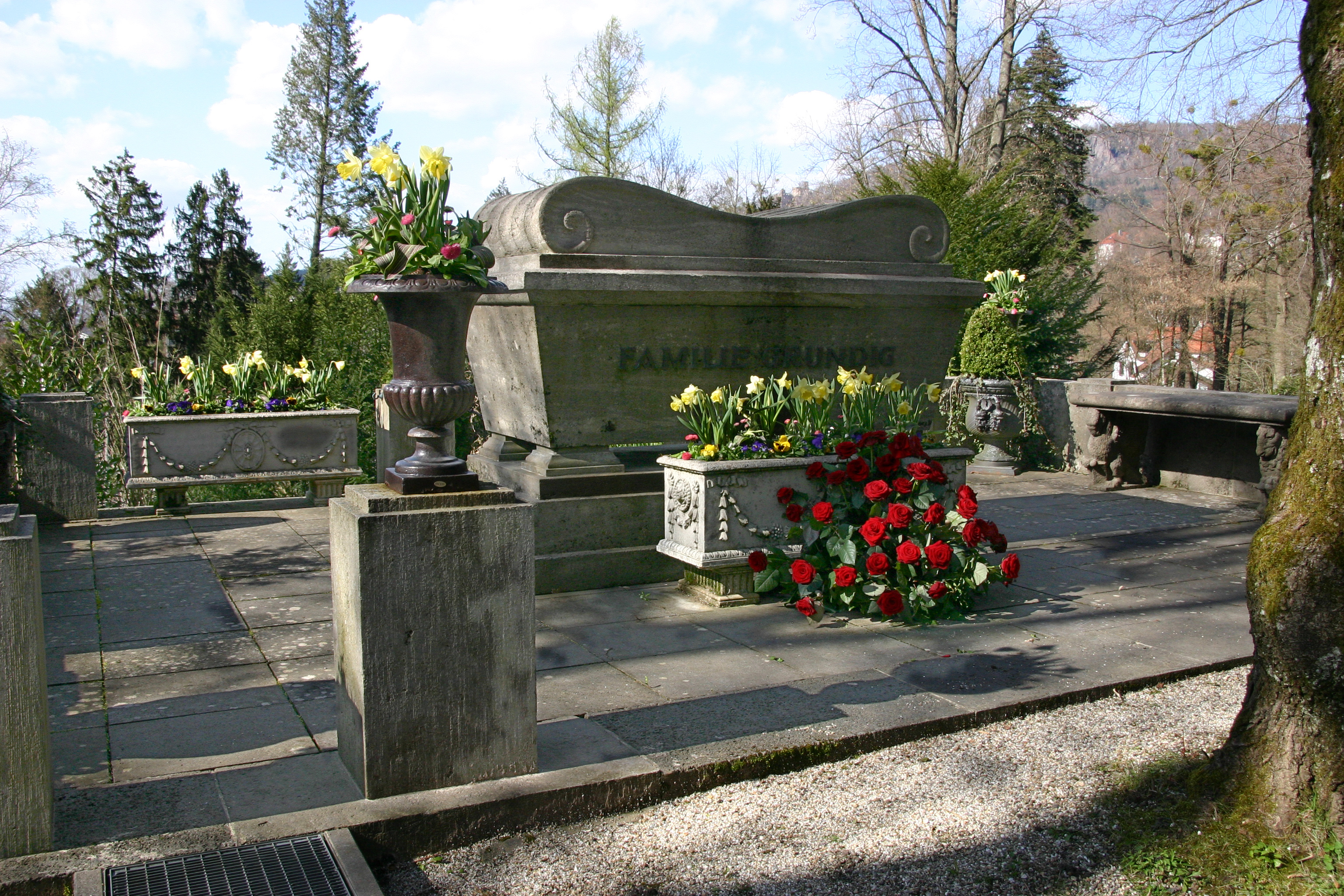
Grave monument in the main cemetery of Baden-Baden

He received the Eduard Rhein Ring of Honor from the German Eduard Rhein Foundation in 1982.
