= Werner von Siemens Ring =

German technical science award

The Werner von Siemens Ring (German: Werner-von-Siemens-Ring) is one of the highest awards for technical sciences in Germany.

It has been awarded from 1916 to 1941 and since 1952 about every three years by the foundation Stiftung Werner-von-Siemens-Ring. The foundation was established on 13 December 1916 on the occasion of the 100th anniversary of the birth of Werner von Siemens. It is located in Berlin and is traditionally managed by the Deutscher Verband Technisch-Wissenschaftlicher Vereine (DVT) (English: German Federation of Technical and Scientific Associations). Before 1960, the name of the award had been simply Siemens Ring (German Siemens-Ring or Siemensring).

The award is presented as a golden ring with emeralds and rubies depicting the leaves and fruit of laurel, placed in an individually crafted cassette carrying the portrait of Werner von Siemens and the dedication to the recipient.

According to the statutes, patron of the foundation council is the President of Germany, and the President of the Physikalisch-Technische Bundesanstalt is the foundation council's executive chairman. The council votes on the recipients. Members of the council are the bearers of the ring and representatives of the member scientific and technical societies.

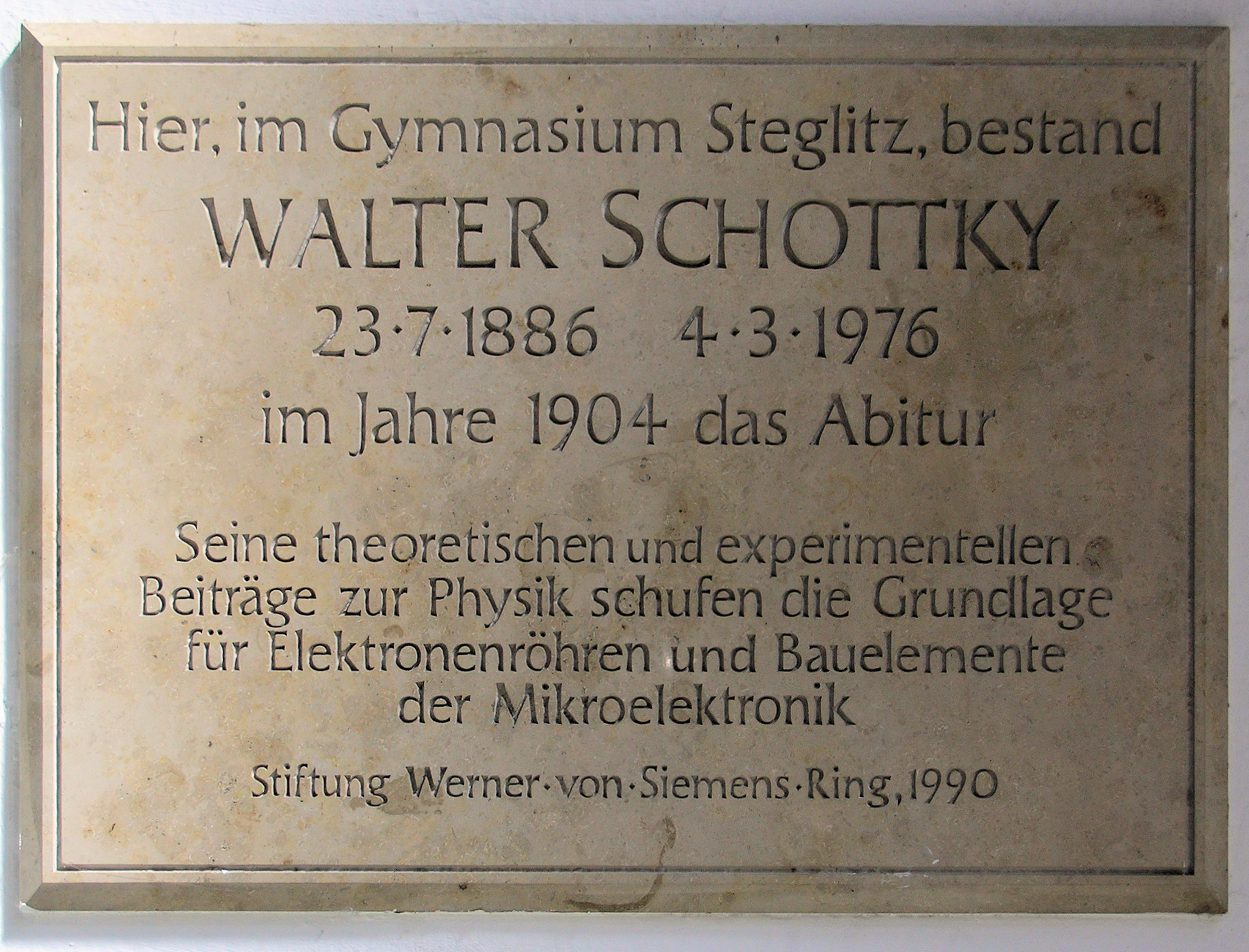
Memorial to Walter Schottky which mentions his Werner von Siemens Ring

== Recipients ==
Source: Werner von Siemens Ring Foundation

Year	Recipient(s)
1916	Carl von Linde
1920	Carl Auer von Welsbach
1924	Carl Bosch
1927	Oskar von Miller
1930	Hugo Junkers
1933	Wolfgang Gaede
1937	Fritz Todt
1941	Walther Bauersfeld
1952	Hermann Röchling
1956	Jonathan Zenneck
1960	Otto Bayer, Walter Reppe, Karl Ziegler
1964	Fritz Leonhardt, Walter Schottky, Konrad Zuse
1968	Karl Küpfmüller, Joachim Siegfried Meurer
1972	Ludwig Bölkow, Karl Winnacker
1975	Wernher von Braun, Walter Bruch
1978	Rudolf Hell
1981	Hans Scherenberg
1984	Fritz Peter Schäfer
1987	Rudolf Schulten
1990	Artur Fischer
1993	Eveline Gottzein
1996	Carl Adam Petri
1999	Dieter Oesterhelt
2002	Jörg Schlaich
2005	Berthold Leibinger
2008	Bernard Meyer (see: Meyer Werft), for his contributions in shipbuilding
2011	Hermann Scholl, Manfred Fuchs
2015	Martin Herrenknecht
2017	Hasso Plattner, Joachim Milberg
2020	Jens Frahm
2022	Stefan Hell, Uğur Şahin, Özlem Türeci, Katalin Karikó, Christoph Huber
2024	Peter Kürz, Michael Kösters

== See also ==
- List of general science and technology awards
- List of engineering awards
