= Intel Ignite =

Corporate startup program by Intel

- Founded: 2019
- Area served: Worldwide
- Owner: Intel
- General manager: Zack Weisfeld
- Key people: Ranny Nachmias -Tel Aviv chapter Managing Director
- Industry: High tech
- Website: intelignite.com
- Registration: Required
- Launched: 2019

Intel Ignite is a global corporate startup program for early-stage startups launched in 2019 by Intel. The program debuted in Tel Aviv and later expanded to include cities in the United States and Germany.

Its global program is run by Zack Weisfeld, a former global head of Microsoft for Startups, and Ranny Nachmias is in charge of its Israeli chapter.

== History ==
In December 2020, the program completed three batches, and companies funded in the final round raised more than $5 million.

In the first quarter of 2021, the program expanded to Austin, Texas and Munich, Germany.
