= Rudolf Hell =

German electrical engineer and inventor (1901–2002)

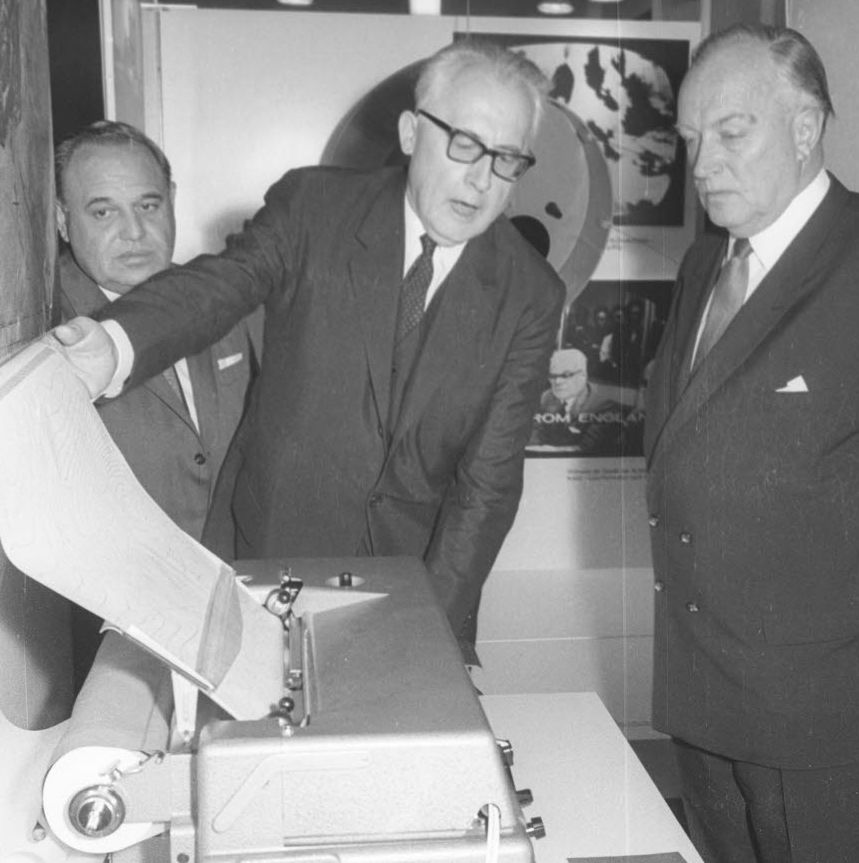
- Hell (centre) in 1968
- Born: 19 December 1901; Eggmühl, Germany
- Died: 11 March 2002 (aged 100); Kiel, Germany
- Occupation(s): Inventor, engineer

Rudolf Hell (19 December 1901 – 11 March 2002) was a German inventor and engineer.

== Career ==
Hell was born in Eggmühl. From 1919 to 1923, he studied electrical engineering in Munich. He worked there from 1923 to 1929 as assistant of Prof. Max Dieckmann, with whom he operated a television station at the Verkehrsausstellung (lit.: "traffic exhibition") in Munich in 1925. In the same year Hell invented an apparatus called the Hellschreiber, an early forerunner to impact dot matrix printers and faxes. Hell received a patent for the Hellschreiber in 1929.

In the year 1929 he founded his own company in Babelsberg. After World War II he re-founded his company in Kiel. He kept on working as an engineer and invented machines for electronically controlled engraving of printing plates and an electronic photo typesetting system called digiset marketed in the US as VideoComp by RCA and later by III.

He has received numerous awards such as the Knight Commander's Cross of the Order of Merit of the Federal Republic of Germany, the Gutenberg Prize of the International Gutenberg Society and the City of Mainz, the Werner von Siemens Ring and the Eduard Rhein Ring of Honor from the German Eduard Rhein Foundation (1992).

His company was taken over by Siemens in 1981 and merged with Linotype in 1990, becoming Linotype-Hell AG.

Hellschreiber is still in use today by amateur radio (ham) operators around the world. Hellverein Kiel collects Hell devices and keeps them functional. In addition, the website contains numerous documents and patents relating to the Hell devices: https://www.hell-kiel.de/en/

== Death ==
Rudolf Hell died in Kiel on 11 March 2002.

== See also ==
- German inventors and discoverers
