= Herrenknecht =

German tunnel boring machine manufacturer

Herrenknecht AG
- Type: Private (AG)
- Industry: Heavy equipment; Geotechnical engineering
- Founded: 1975
- Founder: Martin Herrenknecht
- Headquarters: Schwanau, Germany
- Key people: Martin Herrenknecht, President & CEO
- Products: Tunnel boring machines
- Revenue: €1.288B (2024)
- Net income: €39.3M (2013)
- Number of employees: 5,426 (2018)
- Divisions: Traffic Tunnelling; Utility Tunnelling; Vertical Drilling Rigs
- Subsidiaries: Herrenknecht Vertical GmbH, Maschinen – Und Stahlbau Dresden, Herrenknecht Formwork Technology GmbH
- Website: www.herrenknecht.com/en/

Herrenknecht AG is a German company that manufactures tunnel boring machines (TBMs). Headquartered in Allmannsweier, Schwanau, Baden-Württemberg, it is the worldwide market leader for heavy TBMs.

Established by Martin Herrenknecht in 1975, the company soon grew. Its first overseas subsidiary, Herrenknecht International Ltd, was created in 1984; a further 79 subsidiaries would be set up or purchased over the next 30 years to provide global coverage. Its products have often pushed technological boundaries; a Herrenknecht-built TBM in the late 1990s was the largest in the world at that time, while the world's longest and deepest railway tunnel (the Gotthard Base Tunnel) was bored using the company's apparatus. By 2015, the company had around 5,000 employees.

== History ==
Martin Herrenknecht established the Martin Herrenknecht engineering company in 1975; it initially had six employees. Two years later, it became Herrenknecht GmbH, at which point it had a capital of €20 million. By 1984, Herrenknecht had opened Herrenknecht International Ltd. in Sunderland, England, its first foreign subsidiary.

During the late 1980s, the company became involved with Maschinen und Stahlbau GmbH of Dresden. Following the merger of the two companies in 1988, Herrenknecht became a joint-stock company (AG). Throughout the 1990s and 2000s, the company pursued an expansion strategy to achieve worldwide operations.

During the late 1990s, Herrenknecht built a TBM with a diameter of 14.20 metres (46.6 ft), which was the largest in the world at that time, for a project to increase the capacity of the Elbe Tunnel in Hamburg, Germany (completed in 2002). The boring of the world's longest and deepest railway tunnel, the Gotthard Base Tunnel in Switzerland, was performed using the company's machinery; excavation was completed in 2009, roughly six months ahead of schedule. That same year, Herrenknecht delivered a pair of TBMs with a diameter of 15.43 metres (50.6 ft), then the largest in the world, for the boring of two large tunnels under Shanghai, China.

In December 2012, Herrenknecht acquired Techni-Métal Systemes SAS, a French manufacturer of tunnel supply vehicles; the move expanded the company's portfolio to comprise all technical equipment and services relating to TBMs. Three years later, Herrenknecht launched its first horizontal directional drilling HDD rock cutting tools, which enabled the company to cover the complete drilling process.

By 2015, the company had around 5,000 employees, roughly two-thirds of which worked at the company's headquarters in the installation of hydraulic and electronic components and final inspection. Furthermore, 300 staff worked at three locations across China. In 2015, Herrenknecht had 82 subsidiaries around the world and has worked on 2,600 projects. During the 2010s, the company developed a new semi-trenchless method for pipeline installation; by 2019, roughly 380 km of new pipelines were being installed worldwide using Herrenknecht's technology.

During 2014, the company reported a record level of orders at €1.2 billion, which was primarily attributed to its involvement in the construction of multiple metro expansion schemes across the Middle East and Asia. In the mid 2010s, eight Herrenknecht-built TBMs, valued at £10 million, were deployed to bore a 21-kilometre (13-mile) stretch of tunnel for Crossrail, a mostly-underground commuter railway line beneath London, England.

In May 2020, workers on the Brenner Base Tunnel reportedly set a new record for hard rock tunnel, boring a distance of 61.04 metres (200.3 ft) within 24 hours, a feat that was achieved using a Herrenknecht TBM. During 2021, the UK's largest TBM was delivered by Herrnknecht for the boring of the Silvertown Tunnel. Herrenknecht also produced the TBMs to bore multiple tunnels for Britain's High Speed 2 (HS2) railway line.

During 2023, Herrenknecht acquired a majority stake in the geothermal energy specialist H. Anger’s Söhne Bohr- und Brunnenbaugesellschaft mbH in order to expand the company’s portfolio of automated drilling rigs and equipment. The firm has also investigated the use of advanced control systems, guided by artificial intelligence, in order to minimise noise levels generated from geothermal energy schemes.

== Products and services ==
The company works with the mining, transport and energy sectors, building TBMs for road, railway, metro and utilities construction. In mining, it offers a range of automation technology including underground vehicles, conveyor belts and monitoring systems, and shaft-drilling equipment. In the energy industry, it provides equipment for oil and gas pipelines, fossil fuel exploration, geothermal energy development and electricity tunnels. Its drilling rigs can reach 8 kilometres (5 mi) underground and its TBMs range in diameter from 10 centimetres (3.9 in) to 19 metres (62 ft).

Its other services include tunneling personnel, spare parts/refurbishment, installation, rental and re-used TBMs. As an international company, 90% of its sales were outside of Germany as of 2015. Over time, the company has applied its underground expertise to new areas, such as the decommissioning of offshore wells.

Herrenknecht has formed several partnerships and joint ventures with other companies. During early 2020, the Belgium offshore installation specialist DEME Offshore and Herrenknecht formed a team to produce a subsea drill for use at the Saint-Nazaire Offshore Wind Farm in France. The French geothermal specialist Arverne Group formed a strategic partnership with Herrenknecht to create a new company, DrillDeep, that focuses on extracting deep geothermal energy.

== Gallery ==
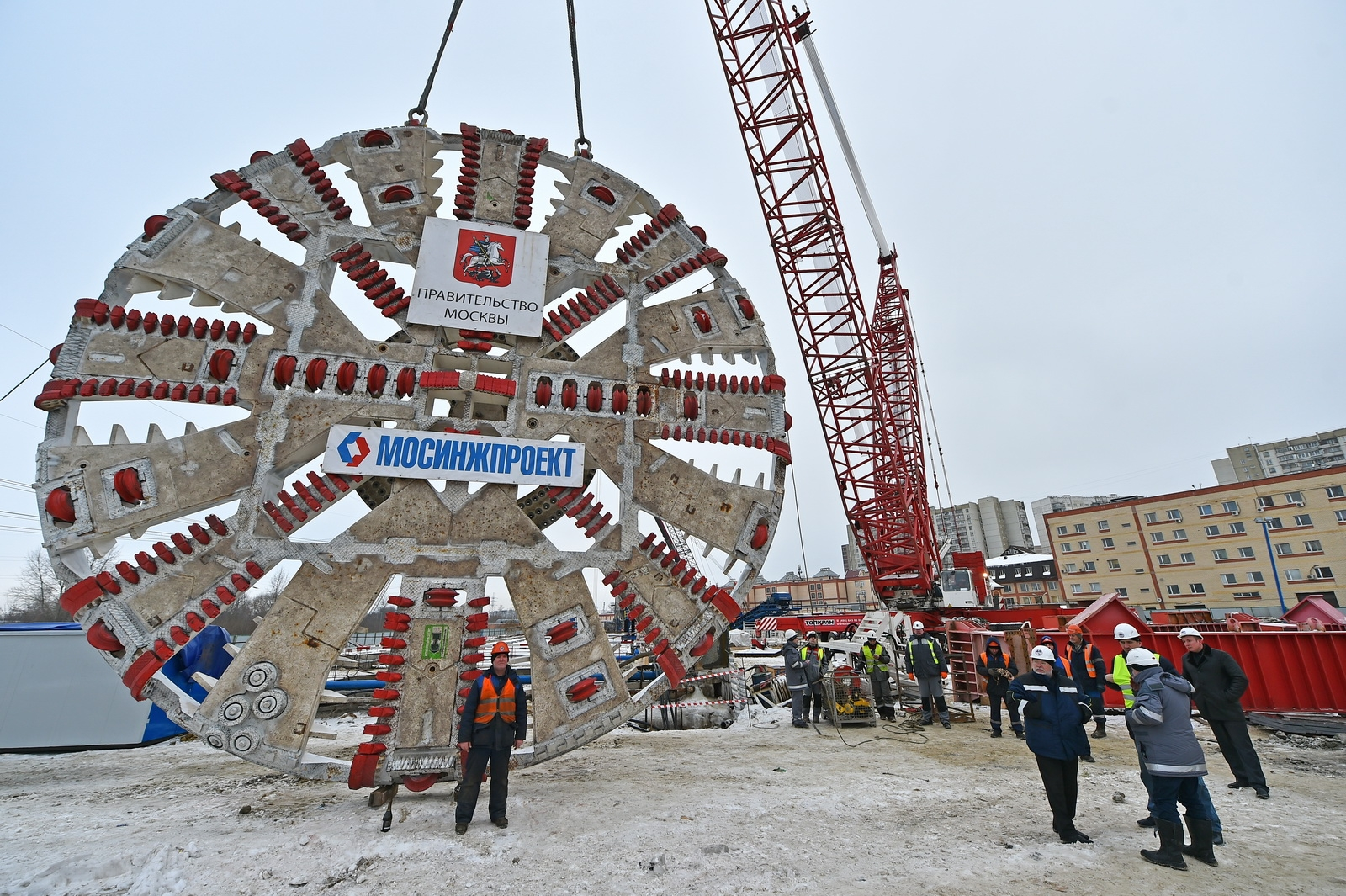
The rotor of TBM at the Nekrasovskaya line construction site in Moscow

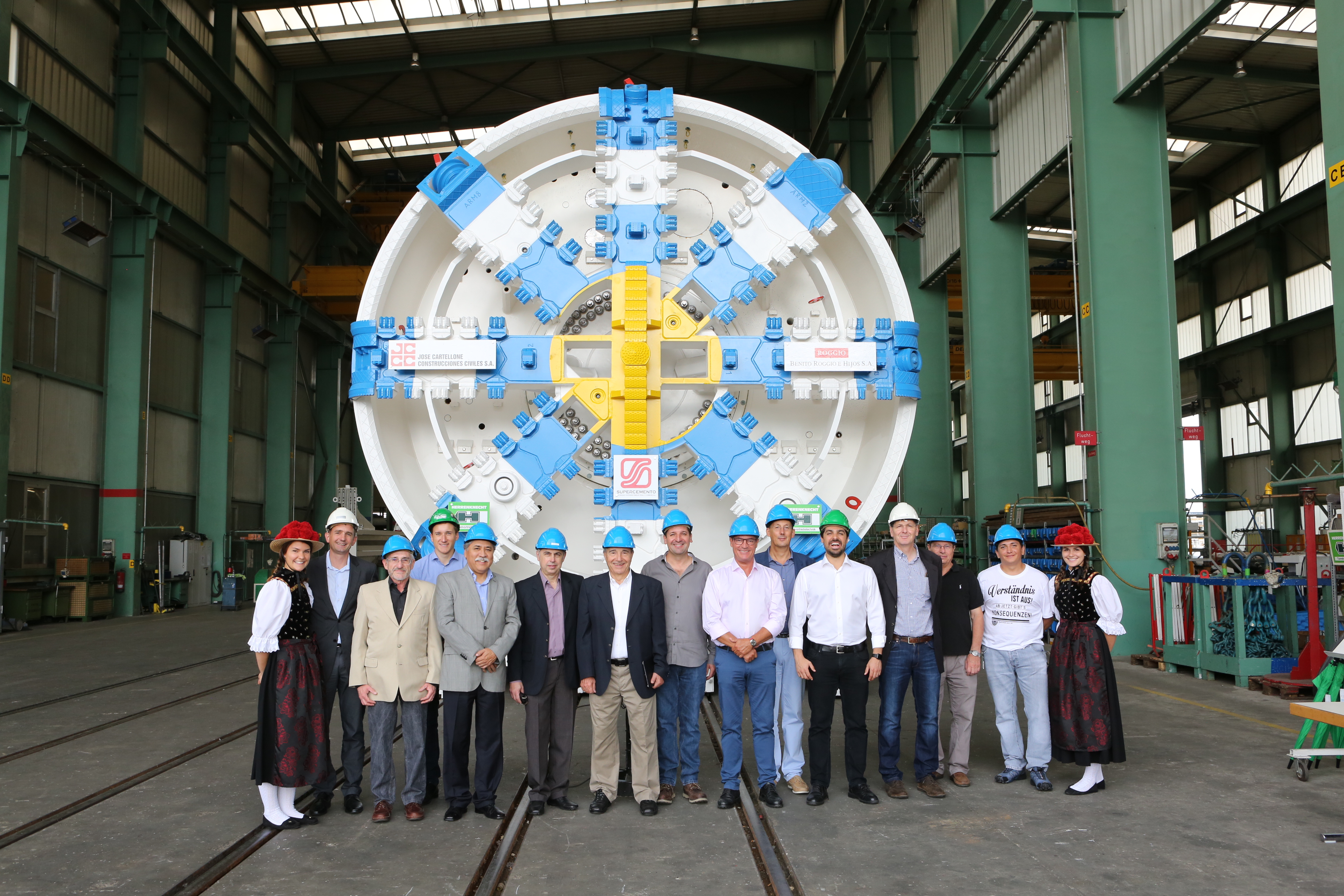
Tunnel boring machine (TBM), Buenos Aires

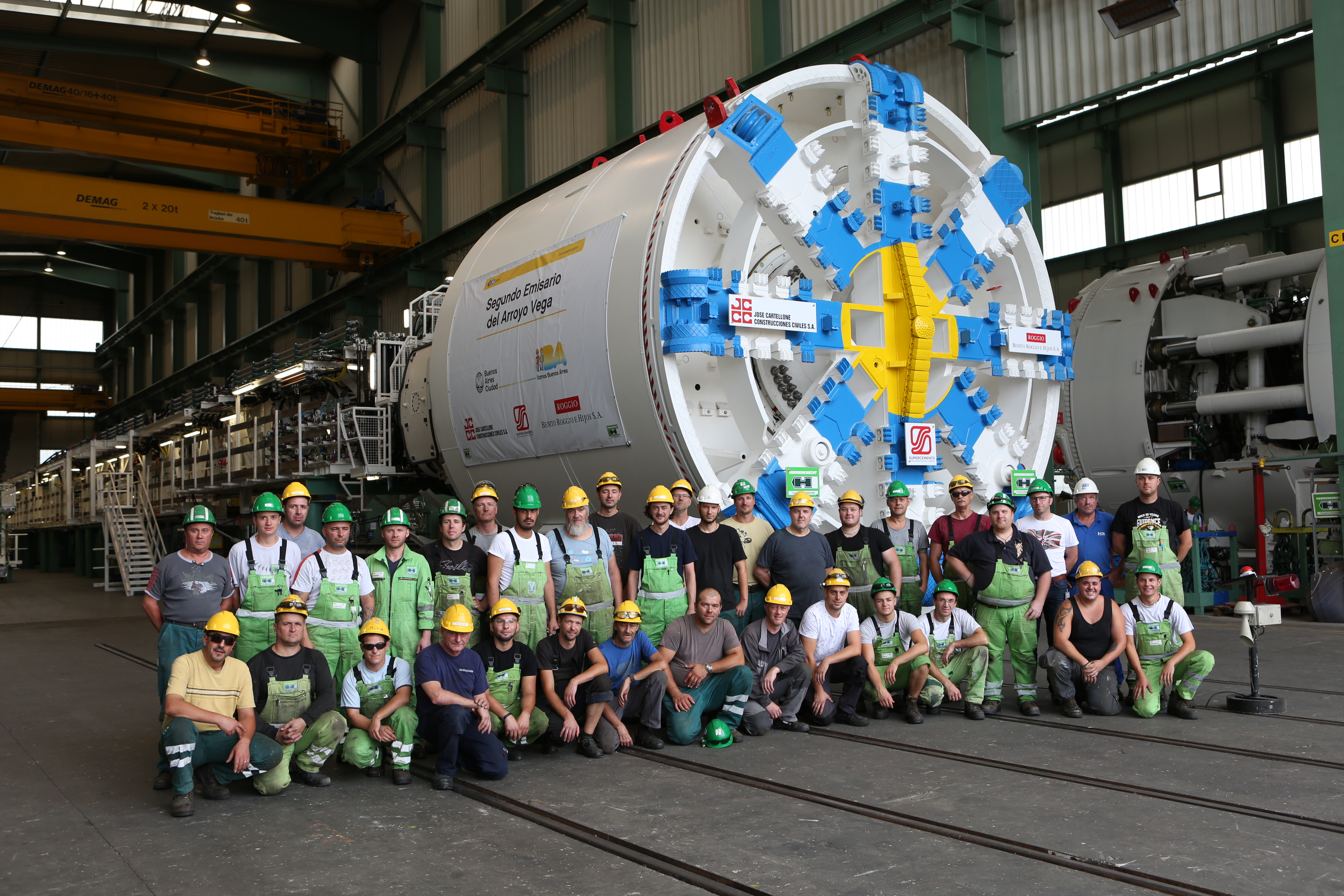
TBM in Buenos Aires

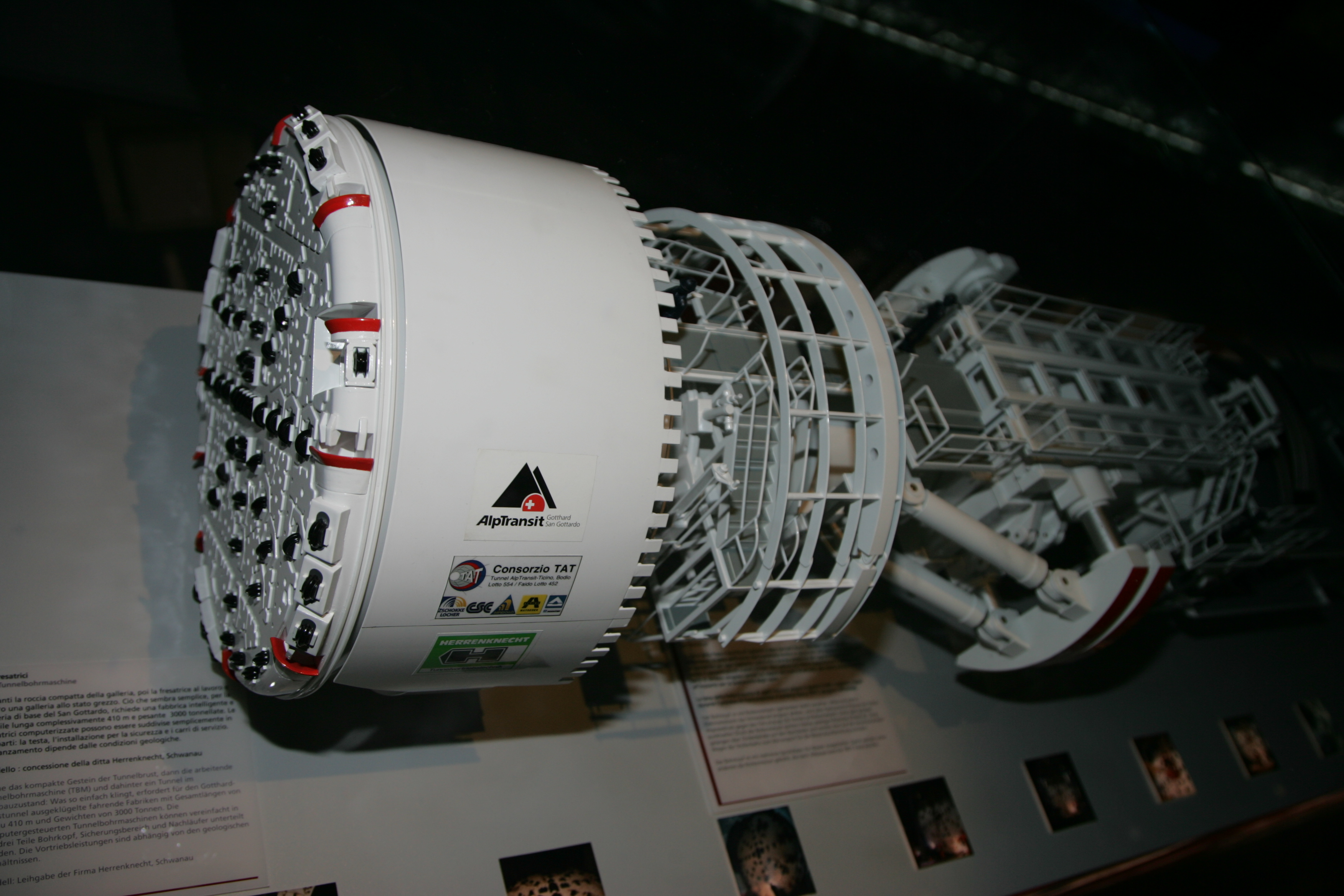
Model of TBM, Gotthard Base Tunnel exhibition

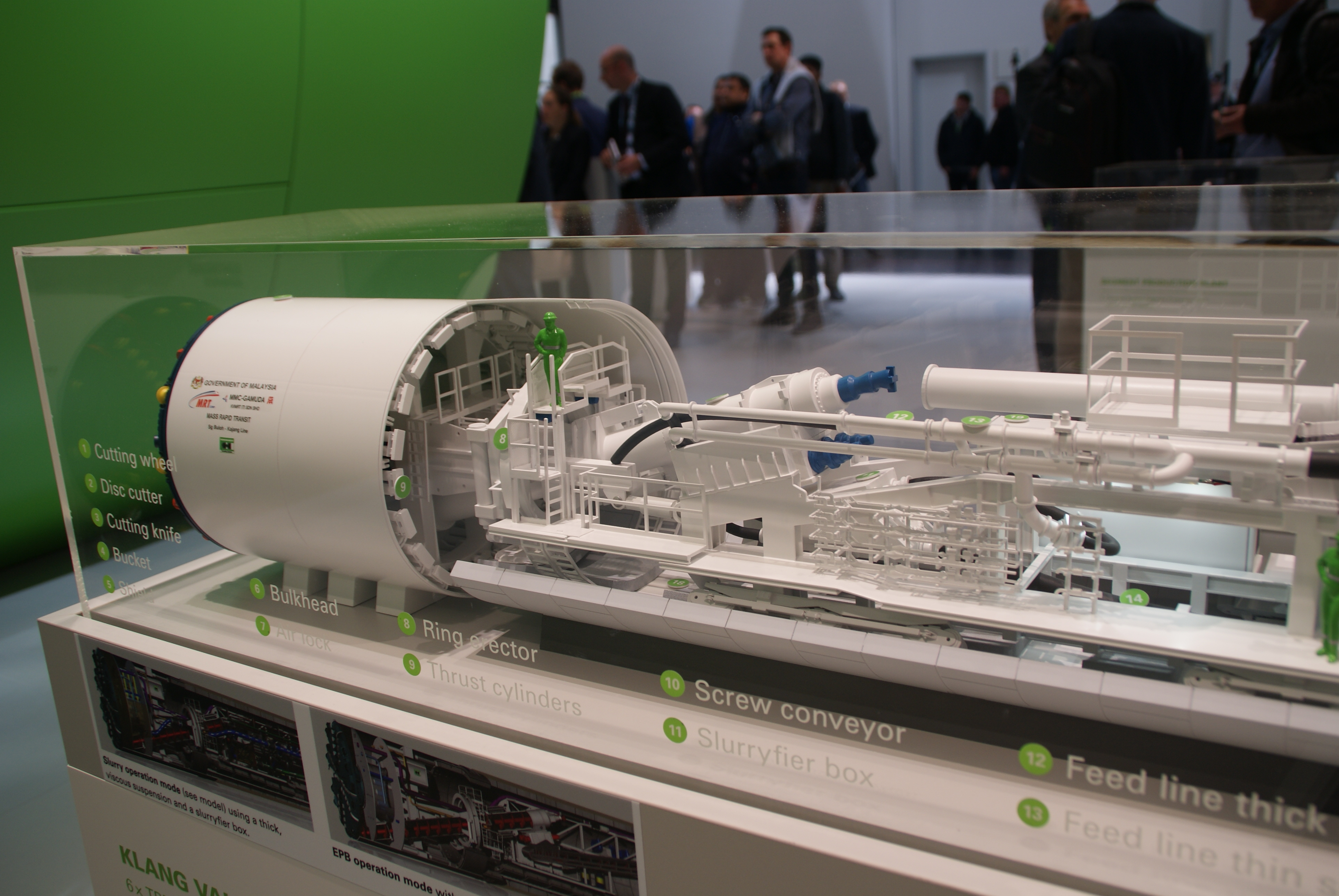
Model of TBM (side view), Bauma 2016

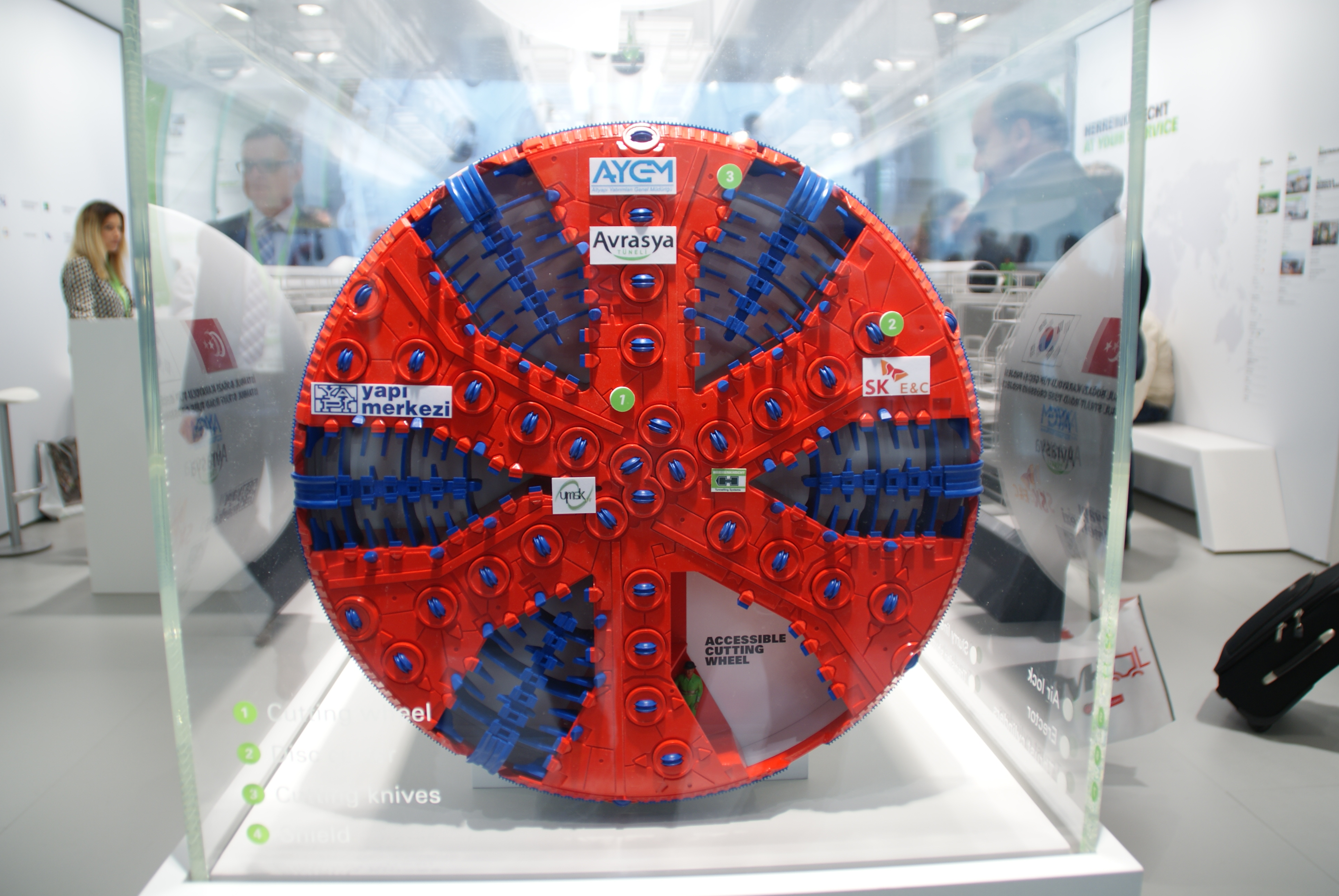
Model of TBM (front view), Bauma 2016
