= Walter Bruch =

German television pioneer (1908–1990)

- Born: 2 March 1908; Neustadt an der Weinstraße, German Empire
- Died: 5 May 1990 (aged 82); Hanover, West Germany
- Occupation: Electrical engineer

Walter Bruch (2 March 1908 – 5 May 1990) was a German electrical engineer and pioneer of German television. He was the inventor of closed-circuit television. He invented the PAL colour television system at Telefunken in the early 1960s. In addition to his research activities, Bruch was an honorary lecturer at Technische Hochschule Hannover. He was awarded the Werner von Siemens Ring in 1975.

== Biography ==
He was born in Neustadt an der Weinstraße in the German Empire. At his father's request he attended a business school, but then trained as a machinist apprenticeship in a shoe factory. From 1928 he attended the university of applied science Hochschule Mittweida in Saxony. After that, he was a guest student at the Technische Hochschule in Charlottenburg (now Technische Universität Berlin), where he met Manfred von Ardenne and the Hungarian inventor Dénes von Mihály.

From the early 1930s Bruch was involved in the development of television technology: in 1933 he presented a "people's television receiver" with a self-built telecine. In 1935 he started work as a technician in the Television and Physics research Department of Telefunken which was headed by Professor Fritz Schröter and where Emil Mechau developed a special television camera for the 1936 Summer Olympics. The Summer Olympic Games of 1936 in Berlin became a milestone for audiovisual technology and Bruch was able to field test the first Iconoscope camera, developed by Emil Mechau based on a tube by Walter Heimann. One year later, at the Paris International Exposition, he introduced an iconoscope television unit that he had designed. During World War II he operated a closed-circuit television system installed at the Peenemünde launch site, so that the V-2 rocket launches could be watched at a safe distance from a bunker.

In 1950, Telefunken commissioned him to develop the first post-war television receivers. Some time later, he returned to physics research and later colour television. He studied and thoroughly tested the American NTSC system and what would later become the French SECAM system. His work led him and co-workers like Gerhard Mahler and Dr. Kruse to devise a new colour television system that automatically corrected for the differential phase distortion that can occur along the transmission channel.

On 3 January 1963, he gave the first public presentation of the Phase Alternation Line System to a group of experts from the European Broadcasting Union in Hannover. This is considered to be the date of birth of the PAL-Telefunken system, which was later adopted by more than thirty countries (at present, more than one hundred). When interviewed by German talk show host Hans Rosenthal on why he had named it the "PAL system", Bruch replied that certainly no German would want to have a "Bruch-System" had his family name been used as the eponym; Bruch in German is synonymous with "broken".

He received the David Sarnoff Medal from the Society of Motion Picture and Television Engineers in 1971 and the Eduard Rhein Ring of Honor from the German Eduard Rhein Foundation in 1981. He died in Hanover, aged 82.

== Awards ==
- 1967: Knight Commander's Cross of the Order of Merit of the Federal Republic of Germany
- 1968: Goldene Kamera 1967 (Golden Camera 1967)
- 1973: Culture Award, German Society for Photography
- 1975: Werner von Siemens Ring
- 1979: Decoration of Honour for Services to the Republic of Austria; Grand Decoration of Honour in Gold
- 1982: Niedersächsischer Staatspreis (Lower Saxony State Prize), for Science
- 1986: Bavarian Maximilian Order for Science and Art
