= Dov Moran =

Israeli entrepreneur, inventor and investor

- דב מורן
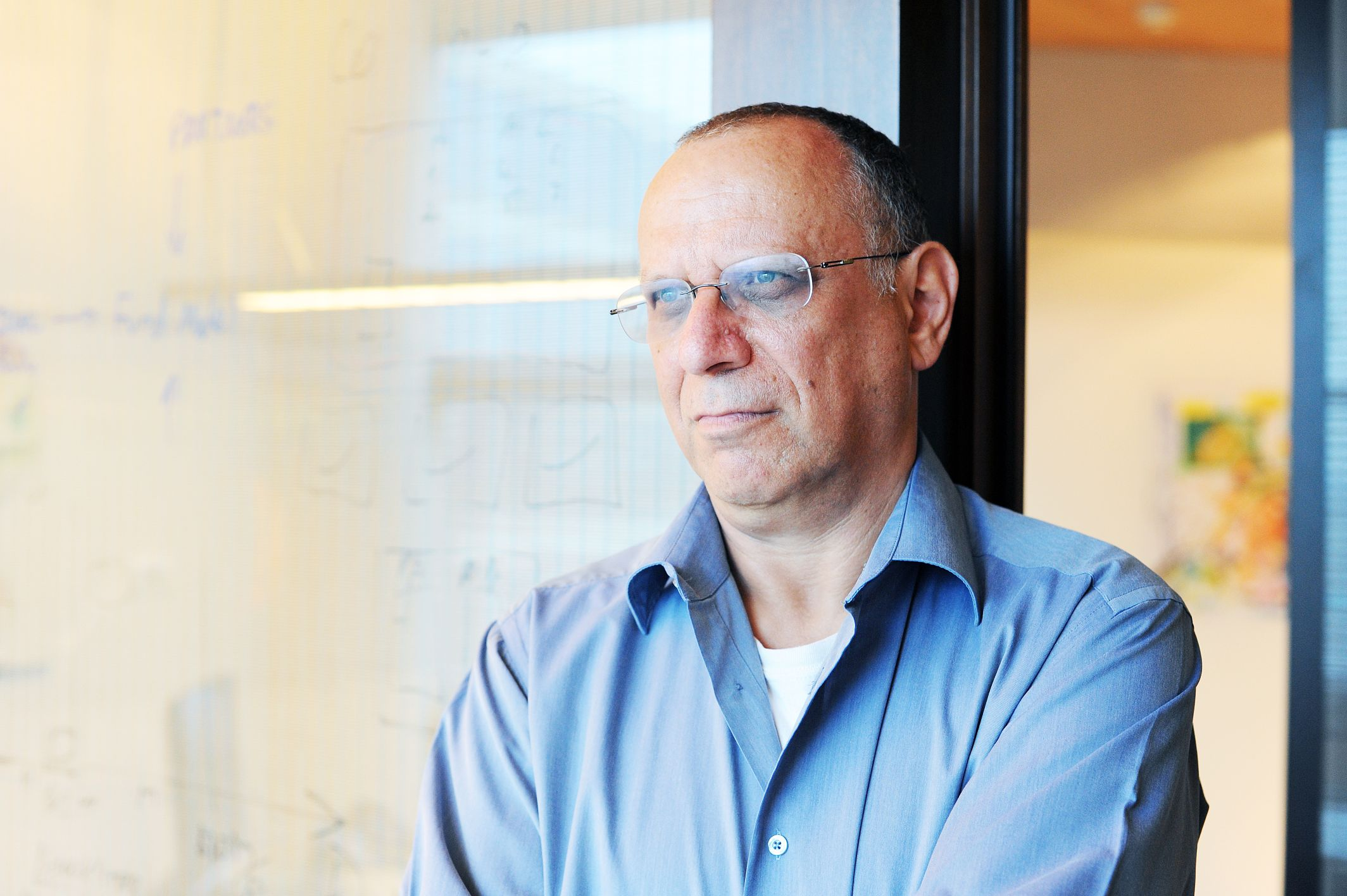
- Moran in 2014.
- Born: July 29, 1955 (age 71); Ramat Gan, Israel
- Education: Technion – Israel Institute of Technology (BSc.)
- Occupations: Businessman, electrical engineer, inventor, investor, writer
- Known for: Inventor of the USB flash drive
- Awards: Edward Award; IEEE Reynold B. Johnson Information Storage Systems Award

Dov Moran (Hebrew: דב מורן; born July 29, 1955) is an Israeli businessman, electrical engineer, inventor, investor, and writer. He is best known as the inventor of the USB memory stick, and one of the most prominent Israeli hi-tech leaders.

== Biography ==
Dov Moran was born in Ramat Gan, Israel, to a family of Holocaust survivors who immigrated to Israel from Poland. His father, Baruch Mintz, came from a well-off family from Krosno. The only Mintz family members who managed to survive the Holocaust were Dov's father and grandfather who began a new life in Israel. Dov's mother, Bina Gever, immigrated to Israel with her family who escaped Blonie.

His interest in high-technology was obvious from his childhood days. At the age of ten he used to order electronic components and digital watch parts from MAD magazine, with the intention to create new improved devices, however, as he later testified, no significant results were achieved. In the following years, his intellectual curiosity and talent started to lead to breakthroughs. At the age of 16 he was sent to an annual course in computers held in Tel-Aviv University. Back then, in order to write a program you needed to mark cards dedicated to that with a pen. After three months of struggling to deal with that system, he wrote his first program. His programming skills improved while he earned a Bachelor of Science degree in Electrical Engineering (with honors) at the Technion – Israel Institute of Technology in Haifa. It was during his university days that led him to decide "to start his own company.”

Moran served in the Israeli Navy for seven years and was commander of its advanced microprocessor department. Prior to becoming a businessman, Moran was an independent technology consultant in the Israeli computer industry.

== Business career ==
Moran formed M-Systems in 1989, a pioneer in the flash data storage market. The company invented the USB flash drive (DiskOnKey), the FlashDisk (DiskOnChip) as well as several other innovative flash data storage devices. Under Moran's leadership, M-Systems grew to $US1 billion revenue within 18 years, and at the end of 2006 it was acquired by SanDisk Corp (NSDQ: SNDK) for $US1.6 billion.

Following the sale of M-Systems, Moran embarked upon the establishment of Modu, that introduced a pioneering innovative concept of a modular smartphone, which subsequently sold its patents to Google in 2011. These patents later became the basis for Google's modular phone project, called Project Ara. Following Modu's acquisition by Google, over 30 cutting-edge high-technology companies emerged, spearheaded by the former employees of Modu.

While running Modu, Moran was also chairman of Tower Semiconductor. Tower's board appointed him in December 2006, and he served as chairman from January 2007. In addition, Moran assumed the role of chairman at Biomas, an enterprise specializing in pharmaceutical development.

=== Inventions ===
Moran has been involved with a number of inventions, mostly in the field of infrastructure technologies. He says he has filed over 40 patents and patent applications. Inventions he's been involved with include:

- USB flash drive (DiskOnKey)- small Flash memory device
- the FlashDisk (DiskOnChip)
- Modu 's revolutionary modular phone - the basis for Google's modular phone Project Ara
- Lightest mobile phone - Modu (weighs 40.1 g) world held the record for the world's lightest mobile phone.
- Smartype - revolutionary smart keyboard
- Comigo's smart interactive TV system - patented hardware and software

=== Investments ===
In January 2015, after several years of angel investing, Moran established Grove Ventures, an Israeli venture capital firm which operates with a funding of worth $US100 million. The venture capital fund mainly specializes in providing seed capital investments in early-stage startups with a focus on advanced groundbreaking technologies such as semiconductors, sensors, artificial intelligence, and digital health. In October 2017, Grove Ventures raised $110 million in commitments. In February 2020, Grove Ventures closed a second fund with $120 million in commitments. In January 2022, Grove Ventures closed a third fund, Grove III, with $185 million.

Companies he invested in or launched include:

- Consumer Physics, A thumb-sized spectrometer which acts as "digital materials analyzer", enabling a user to identify products' source, freshness, ingredients, the mix of materials and nutrition value.
- Sensible Medical Innovation Ltd., Absolute lung fluid monitor based on sensing and monitoring technology providing data for the management and treatment of several chronic medical conditions.
- GlucoMe, develops a blood glucose meter that provides an interface to the cloud through a phone or tablet to allow data gathering and analysis, alerts and patient monitoring.
- Geneformics, focused on computing for genomics (DNA sequencing). Geneformics aims to provide savings in the storage, communications and cloud processing of DNA sequencing.
- RapidAPI, a company that developed application programming interfaces (APIs).

According to Moran, he views education as the fundamental crucial basis in promoting scientific advancement and cultivating technological innovation. In his role as an active angel investor and engaged venture capitalist seeking to take advantage of harnessing the potential of the most promising emerging Israeli high-technology start-ups, Moran provides guidance and mentorship to up-and-coming Israeli high-technology entrepreneurs, offering valuable assistance in transforming their research and innovative ideas into tangible goods and services suitable for commercial business endeavors. As such, he lectures extensively in universities and schools and sits on the advisory board of Tel Aviv University Momentum Fund.

In addition to several investments made by the fund. Moran has also invested in Learni, a technology company which aims to provide efficient educational solutions for interactive material, live teaching resources, that work in real-time, and student evaluations while also enabling rich digital textbooks in a managed interactive classroom environment.

== Community activism and public sector career ==
He is an active member of the Korean Israel Business Forum, having spoken at conferences, and in 2014, was asked by the Korean government to spearhead a project aimed at growing innovation in Seoul, the capital of Korea.

The Yedioth Book publishing company published his book, titled "100 Doors - An Introduction to Entrepreneurship," which was released in September 2016.

== Awards and recognition ==
- In 2003 he was named Entrepreneur of the Year by Ernst & Young, and "CEO of the Year" by the IMC.
- In 2007, the IVA (Israel Venture Association) awarded Dov Moran the Israeli Hi-Tech award as Entrepreneur of the Year.
- In 2012 Moran was awarded the prestigious Edward Rhein Award for inventing the USB flash drive.
- In 2013, he was named "Doctor Honoris Causa" from Moscow State Technical University of Radio Engineering, Electronics and Automation.
- In the same year he had the title Honoris Causa conferred on him by the Academic Center for Law and Science in Israel, in the company of other notable leaders such as former Prime Minister Ehud Barak, Minister of Education Rabbi Shai Piron and Canada's Former Minister of Justice and State Attorney, Prof. Irwin Cotler.
- Again in 2013, he was presented with a lifetime achievement Award by Geektime. Its "Geek Awards" are an annual competition to recognize and celebrate the most compelling startups, entrepreneurs and investors of the year in Israel.
- In 2015, he received the Johnson Information Storage Systems Award for pioneering contributions to storage systems based on flash memory.
- In 2016, Moran was awarded honorary doctorate at Technion-Israel Institute of Technology.
- In February 2018 Moran received, among others, the Netexplo Talent of the Year award in a ceremony held by UNESCO in Paris.

== Personal life ==
Moran is married and has four children. His wife became religious 20 years after they got married.

== See also ==
- Pua Khein-Seng
- Netac Technology
