= Martin Herrenknecht =

German engineer and businessman (born 1942)

Martin Herrenknecht (born 24 June 1942) is a German engineer and businessman. He founded an engineering company in 1975, which became Herrenknecht AG in 1977. Today his company makes large, heavy tunnel boring machines. They have 4955 employees as of 2015.

Herrenknecht is the son of an upholsterer from Schwanau, Baden-Württemberg. He graduated from Max Planck Gymnasium and studied at the University of Constance, earning an engineering degree in 1964. In 2010, his company drilled the largest tunnel in the world. He is a member of the Christian Democratic Union.

He received the Werner von Siemens Ring in 2015.

He has caused some controversy in his Stuttgart 21 development project. The Green politician Winfried Hermann accused him of having too close a relationship with Lothar Späth.
