= Eveline Gottzein =

German engineer (1931–2023)

- Born: 30 September 1931; Leipzig, Saxony, Germany
- Died: 24 December 2023 (aged 92)
- Citizenship: German
- Education: Technical University of Dresden; Technical University of Darmstadt; Technical University of Munich
- Known for: Control engineering
- Scientific career
- Workplaces: University of Stuttgart
- Thesis: Das „Magnetische Rad“ als autonome Funktionseinheit modularer Trag- und Führsysteme für Magnetbahnen (1984)

Eveline Gottzein (30 September 1931 – 24 December 2023) was a German engineer and honorary professor of aerospace engineering at the University of Stuttgart.

== Early life and education ==
Eveline Gottzein was born in Leipzig, Germany on 30 September 1931. Her father was an engineer and encouraged both his daughters in their interest in the field. Following the Second World War, Leipzig became part of the German Democratic Republic, where the family's middle class status was sometimes an issue in the socialist state.

After completing her secondary education and earning her Abitur in 1949, Gottzein completed an apprenticeship in Electrical Engineering at the RFT Centre for Telecommunication in Leipzig. East German state policies encouraged women into technical fields such as engineering although Gottzein struggled to get a recommendation for further study due to her family's status.

Gottzein eventually managed to enroll at the Technical University of Dresden (1952–1957), studying Electrical Engineering, Mathematics and Physics after receiving a recommendation of her employer. She worked on developing MOSYAN electrical equipment to simulate complex industrial processes, which became a highlight at the spring trade fair in Leipzig. As a result of this success, Gottzien was awarded a consultant contract and allowed to travel to Berlin, and permitted to take luggage. In this way, she was able to escape from the GDR but had not been able to let her family know of her plans in advance. She had managed to post some of her academic physics books ahead of her in hopes of extending her studies. Her family were put under surveillance due to her action and her sister, a skilled glider pilot, was banned from flying in case she attempted to join her.

Gottzein was processed through the refugee reception centre in Gießen and was determined to study in Darmstadt, having researched the professors on the staff there, including Heinrich Barkhausen. Gottzein did not have proof of her East German qualifications as carrying them during her escape would have been dangerous. As a result, she had to resit her diploma qualification examinations in West Germany before moving on to more academic studies. She enrolled at Technical University of Darmstadt and studied there between 1957 and 1962.

To earn money to fund herself during her studies Gottzein sold knitting machines then worked as an engineer at the Electronic Associates’ European Simulation Centre in Brussels. She commuted by plane between there and Darmstadt.

== Career ==
Gottzein started work at the Bölkow KG company in Ottobrunn, and by 1963 had become head of a department. She took up hiking in the Bavarian mountains.

In 1983 Gottzein gained her doctorate at the Technical University of Munich, allowing her to use the title Dr.-Ing. Her thesis was on "The Magnetic Wheel as an autonomous functional unit of modular support and guidance systems for magnetic tracks". She undertook the study whilst working full time.

In 1989 she became a lecturer at the University of Stuttgart in "Regulatory Problems in Space", and became an honorary professor in 1996. She was also an honorary professor of the Technical University of Munich.

Gottzein specialised in control technology, especially orbital control of satellites, and control systems for guidance systems for high-speed magnetic tracks. She was a scientific advisor to Airbus in the development of a GPS receiver for commercial space applications. She is listed as an inventor on multiple patents. She led the Control and Simulation Department of the Space Division of Astrium.

In 1993, Gottzein was the first, and so far only, woman to be awarded the Werner von Siemens Ring, one of the highest awards for technical sciences in Germany.

Gottzein died on 24 December 2023, at the age of 92.

== Awards ==
- 1993 Werner von Siemens Ring
- 1996 Bavarian Order of Merit
- 1998 Bavarian Maximilian Order for Science and Art
- 2000 Great Cross of Merit
- 2007 American Institute of Aeronautics and Astronautics Fellow
- 2008 International Federation of Automatic Control Fellow
- 2011 Distinguished Affiliated Professor Technical University of Munich

== Other sources ==
- Martin Morlock: Verschiebung. Der Spiegel, 17 January 1966, p89
