= James West (inventor) =

American inventor and acoustician (born 1931)

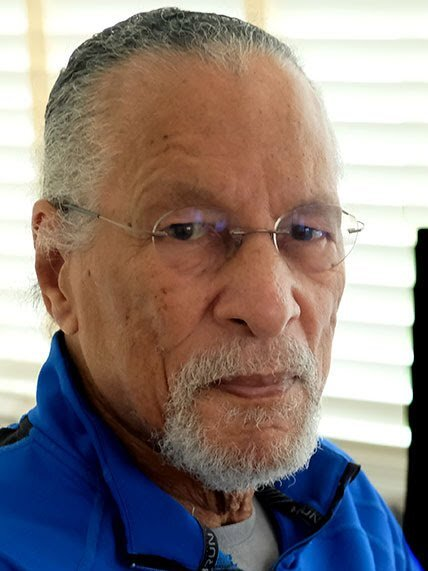
- Born: February 10, 1931 (age 95); Farmville, Prince Edward County, Virginia, U.S.
- Education: Hampton University, Temple University
- Awards: ASA Gold Medal (2006); National Medal of Technology and Innovation (2006); John Scott Medal (2018)
- Scientific career
- Fields: Physics, Electrical Engineering
- Workplaces: Bell Labs; Johns Hopkins University

James Edward Maceo West (born February 10, 1931) is an American inventor and acoustician. He holds over 250 foreign and U.S. patents for the production and design of microphones and techniques for creating polymer foil electrets.

== Early life and education ==
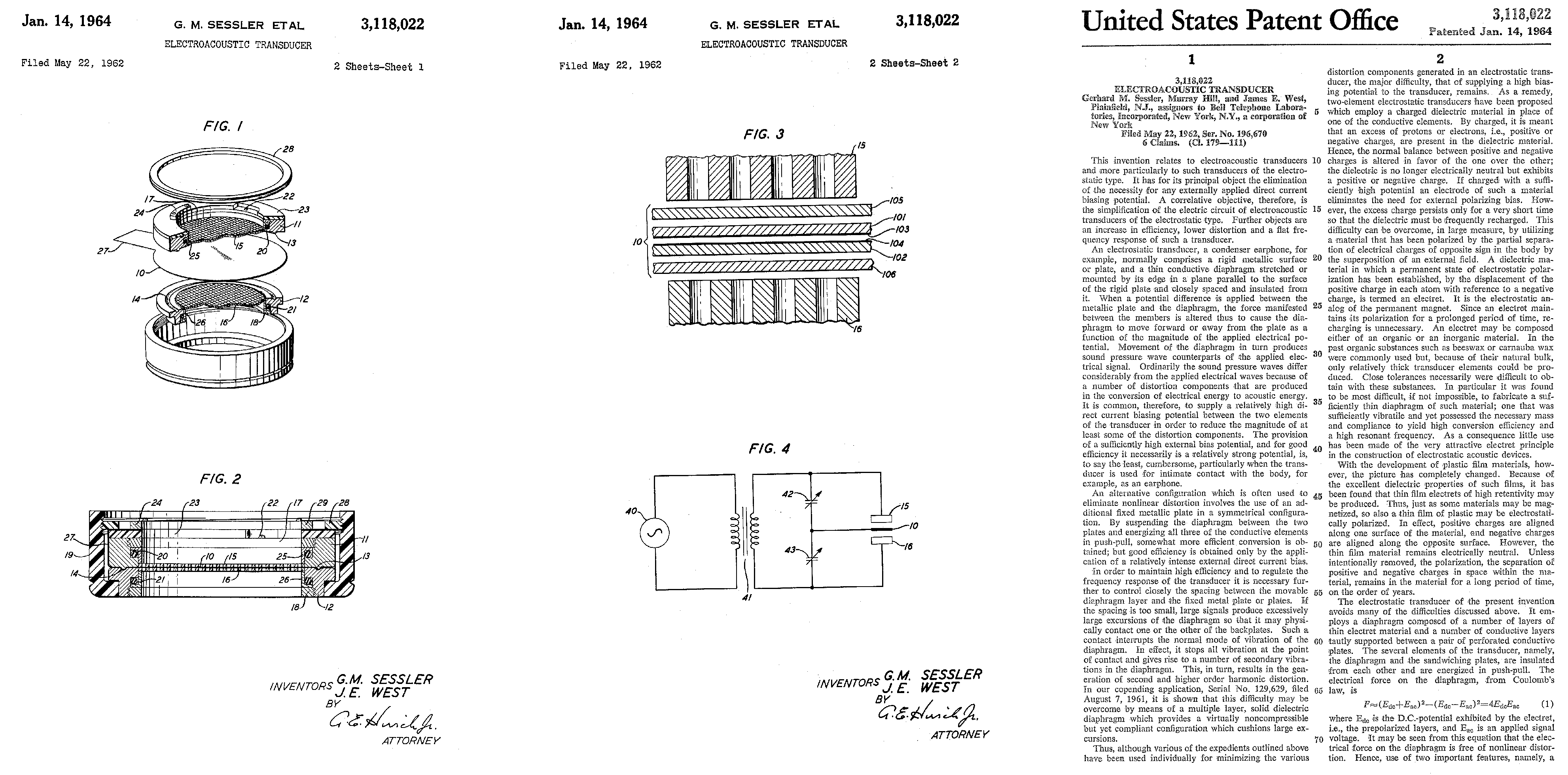
First patent on foil electret microphone by G. M. Sessler and J. E. West (pages 1 to 3)

West was born on February 10, 1931, in Farmville, Prince Edward County, Virginia as the elder of two children to Samuel Edward and Matilda West. He was born in his maternal grandfather's house because the local hospital would not admit Black people. His father worked at various points as a funeral home owner, an insurance salesman, and as a Pullman porter on the Baltimore and Ohio Railroad. His mother was a schoolteacher who worked at Langley Air Force Base during World War II; she later lost her job due to her involvement in the NAACP and became one of the "Hidden Figures" (Black astrophysicists who worked for NASA at Langley Research Center and received little to no credit for their work). His maternal grandmother, who was formerly enslaved, was a major influence on him; she raised him while his mother was away teaching at a Native American reservation in Pennsylvania. He became interested in electricity at twelve years old after taking a job installing electrical wiring in homes in rural Virginia with his cousin.

After attending school in Farmville, his parents moved him to Phenix High School in Hampton, Virginia for better opportunities. Because medicine was one of the few viable professions for African-Americans in the segregation era, he undertook a pre-medical track at Hampton University, before being drafted into the U.S. Army in the Korean War, where he received a Purple Heart after being wounded there. With the assistance of the G.I. Bill, he then attended Temple University where he began majoring in solid state physics. His parents had warned him that he would not find professional employment in electronics as a Black man; they consequently stopped financially supporting him as a result of his decision to switch degrees. At Temple University, West was initially excluded from study groups due to his race but was soon invited after he was able to solve even the most complex group problems on his own.

As a graduate student, he interned with Bell Laboratories where he began designing work on the Electret microphone. He completed bachelor's and master's coursework in physics at Temple University by 1957 but did not officially graduate because he returned to Bell Laboratories to continue his work on the microphone in November of that year.

== Career and personal life ==
Along with Gerhard Sessler, West invented the foil electret microphone in 1962 while developing instruments for human hearing research. Compared to the previous condenser microphones, the electret microphone has higher capacitance and does not require a DC bias. West and Sessler optimized the mechanical and surface parameters of the system. Nearly 90 percent of the microphones produced annually are based on the principles of the foil-electret and are used in everyday items such as telephones, camcorders, hearing aids, baby monitors, and audio recording devices among others.

West measured the acoustics of Philharmonic Hall in New York City.

In a study published in 2005, West teamed with Ilene Busch-Vishniac and studied the acoustic environment of hospitals showing that hospitals are in general too loud and that the noise levels affect staff and patients.

At Johns Hopkins, he has worked on a device to detect pneumonia in lungs of young children. His research at Johns Hopkins also includes efforts to improve teleconferencing technology by transmitting stereophonic sound over the Internet and new transducers.

Throughout his career, West has been a fervent advocate for greater diversity in the fields of science and technology. While at Bell Laboratories, West co-founded the Association of Black Laboratory Employees (ABLE), an organization formed to "address placement and promotional concerns of Black Bell Laboratories employees." He was also instrumental in the creation and development of both the Corporate Research Fellowship Program (CRFP) for graduate students pursuing terminal degrees in the sciences, as well as the Summer Research Program, which together provided opportunities for over 500 non-white graduate students. Since 2015, West has served on the board of directors of the Ingenuity Project, a Baltimore non-profit that supports talented middle and high school students in science and math. West has long been known for being a mentor to students, and for being active in initiating and participating in programs aimed at encouraging more minorities and women to enter the fields of science, technology, mathematics, and engineering (STEM).

In 2001, West retired from Lucent Technologies after a distinguished 40-year career at Bell Laboratories where he received the organization's highest honor, being named a Bell Laboratories Fellow. West then joined the faculty of the Whiting School at Johns Hopkins University where he is a professor in the Department of Electrical and Computer Engineering. In 2007, West received an honorary doctorate from NJIT.

He has lived in Plainfield, New Jersey. He is married to Marlene, a teacher in Plainfield, and has four children.

== Awards ==
West received a National Medal of Technology and Innovation in 2006, and in 2010, along with Gerhard M. Sessler, he received The Franklin Institute's Benjamin Franklin Medal in Electrical Engineering. In 2018 he received a John Scott Medal. He was elected a member of the National Academy of Engineering in 1998 for "electret transducers and their applications to microphones". He received an IRI Achievement Award in 1998. He was inducted into the National Inventors Hall of Fame in 1999 and the New Jersey Inventors Hall of Fame in 2008. In 2002 he was made a Life Fellow of the Institute of Electrical and Electronics Engineers (IEEE). The Acoustical Society of America, of which he was president from 1998 to 1999, awarded him with a fellowship in 1985, their Silver Medal in 1995, and their Gold Medal in 2006. In 2018, they renamed their Minority Fellowship (established in 1992) in his honor as the James E. West Fellowship, due to his role in setting it up and his general advocacy in this space.
