= M-Systems =

Israeli electronics company

- Company type: Public
- Industry: Computer hardware
- Founded: Kfar Saba, Israel 1989
- Founder: Dov Moran and Aryeh Mergi
- Defunct: November 19, 2006
- Fate: Acquired by SanDisk
- Area served: Worldwide
- Key people: Dov Moran, Aryeh Mergi Founders
- Products: DiskOnKey; DiskOnChip

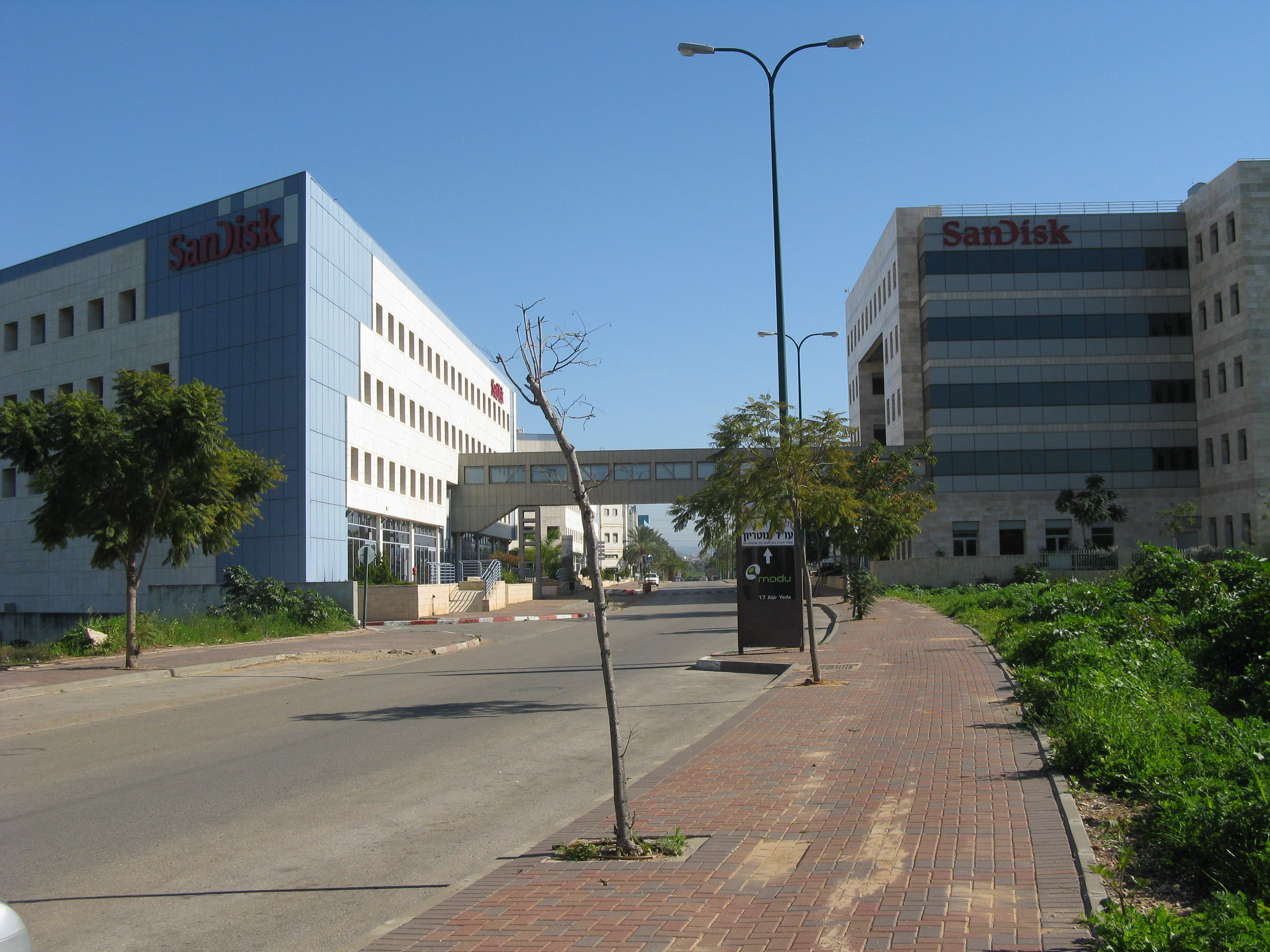
The former M-Systems HQ, now a SanDisk facility

M-Systems Ltd., (sometimes spelled msystems) was a Nasdaq-listed Israeli producer of flash memory storage products founded in 1989 by Dov Moran and Aryeh Mergi, based in Kfar Saba, Israel. They were best known for developing and patenting the first flash drive, marketed in 1995 as DiskOnChip, and the first USB flash drive, marketed in 2000 as DiskOnKey. They also created the patented True Flash Filing System (TrueFFS) which presented the flash memory as a disk drive to the computer. They also produced flash solid state drives for PATA, SATA, SCSI and SAS interfaces. After 17 years of business, they were acquired by their prior competitor, SanDisk, in 2006. The DiskOnChip (DOC) was developed at the R&D Center established by M-Systems called EUROM. Rick Iorillo, Rony Levy and David Deitcher were the individuals that worked on the development and marketing of the first 2 MB DOC. This product went on to receive the Most Innovative Award from EDN in 1995 and later went on to become the Flash Drive and DiskOnKey.

== DiskOnKey ==
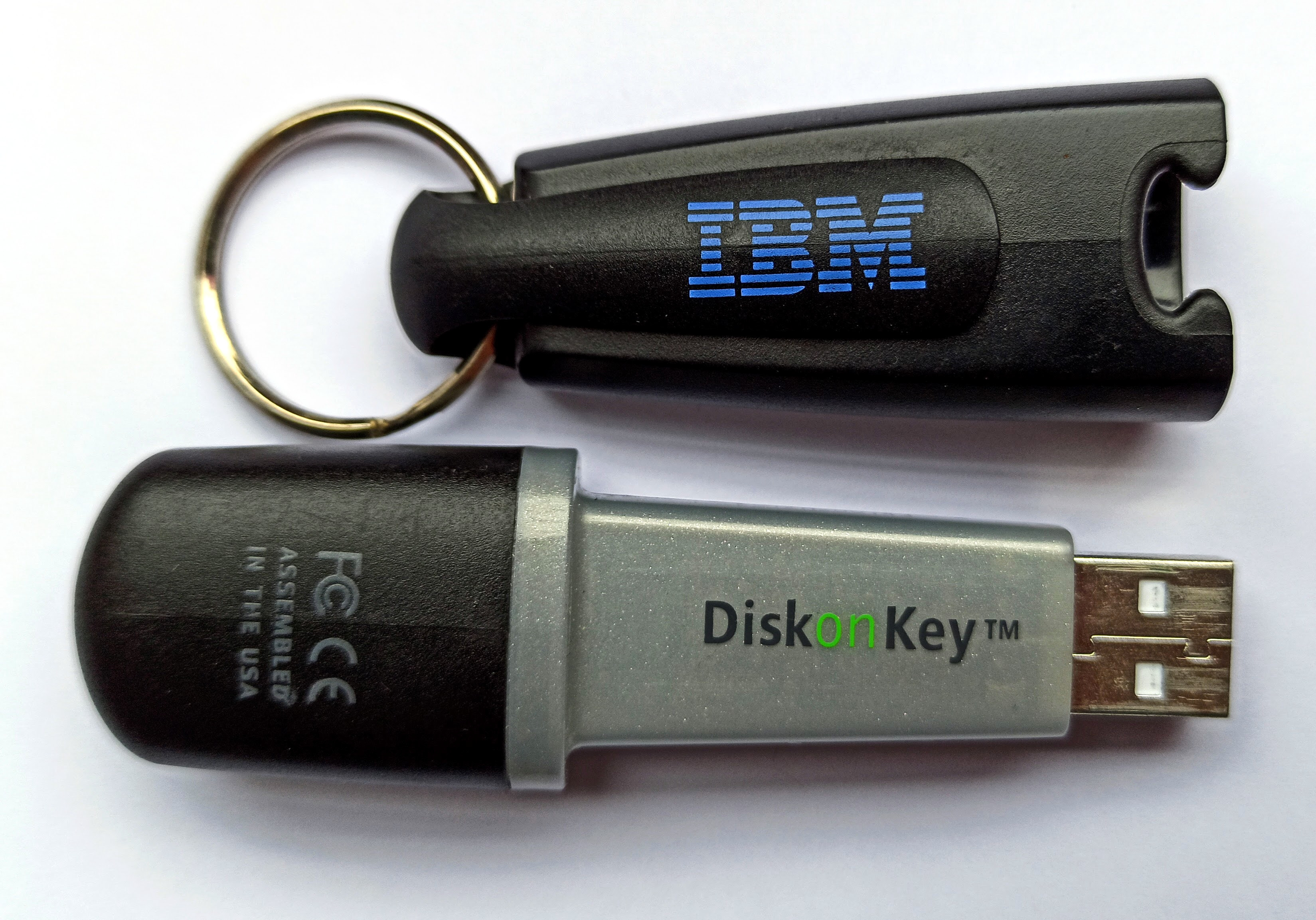
DiskOnKey thumb drive

DiskOnKey was a small Flash memory device encased in a plastic enclosure with an integrated flash controller that connected to the USB port on a computer. It was introduced by M-Systems and IBM in 2000 with 8 MB of storage and was the first what are later commonly called "thumb drives" because of their size. It required no separate power or device drivers from the computer if running Windows 2000, or Windows ME; it was a true plug and play device. In Windows 98 it required a driver which was supplied on a CD-ROM. The computer saw the device as a hard disk drive and it came in capacities of 8, 16, and 32 MB. It was marketed as a hard disk on a keychain. It had an integrated LED which indicated when the device was reading or writing data to prevent premature removal from the computer. The performance was about 10 times faster than writing data to a floppy drive.

== DiskOnChip ==
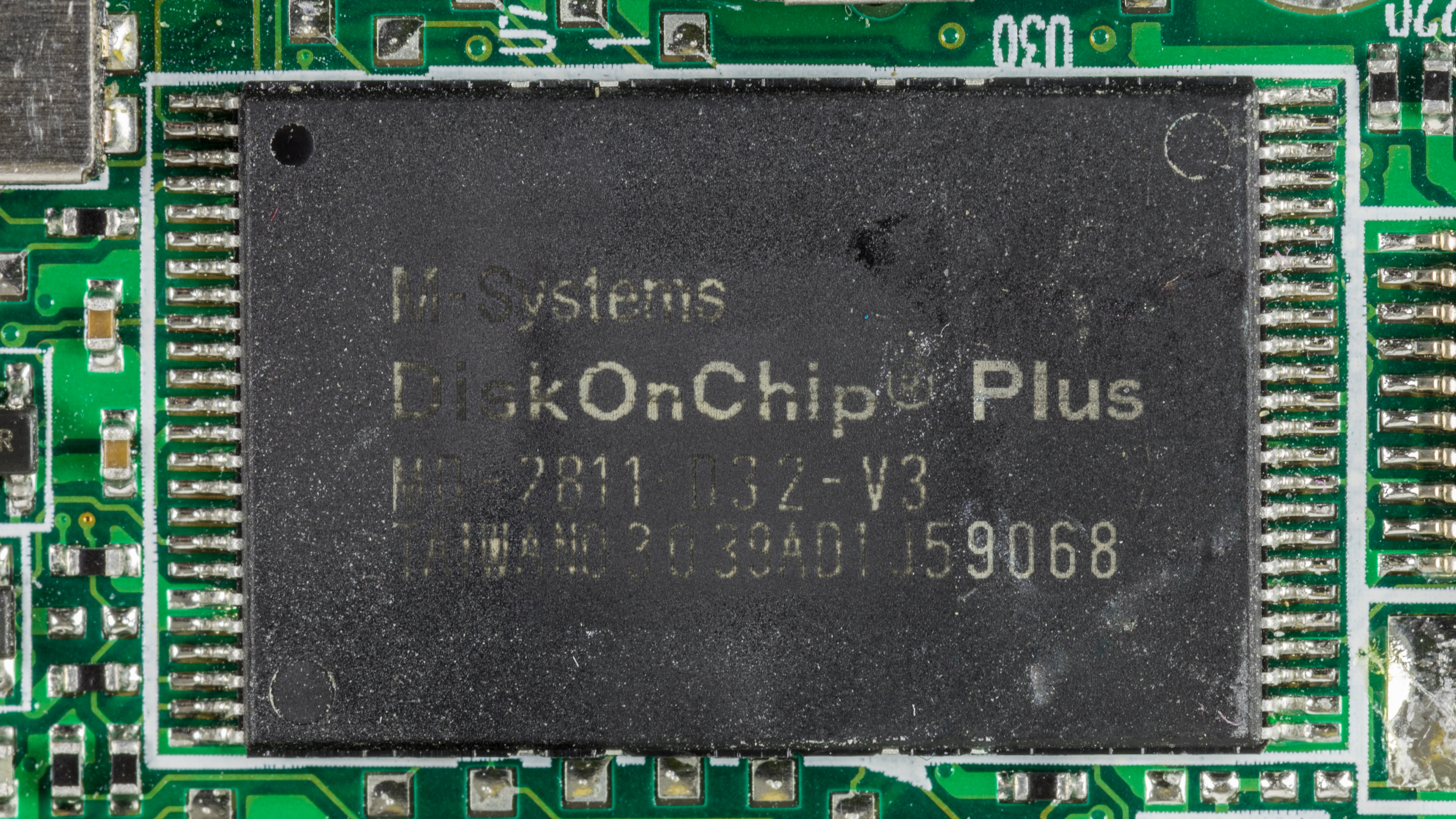
DiskOnChip Plus MD2811-D32-V3

The DiskOnChip (DoC) product line became popular because they could easily be integrated into small embedded applications. The device was supplied as a module in a 32-pin dual in-line package (DIP) with a pinout and electrical interface compatible with a standard JEDEC socket for memory chips. It employed a memory-mapped interface with an 8 KB window for models of all capacities (16 MB–1 GB). Internally, a DoC module contained a controller that implemented ECC, bad block re-mapping and wear leveling functions that were used to implement a file system, TrueFFS, for which the company provided software development kits.

The subsidiary of M-Systems called EUROM was established to design, build and sell the DOC to the U.S. and Asian embedded computer distributors. The first customer for the DOC was Ampro. David Feldman, President of Ampro and Rick Iorillo, President of EUROM U.S. completed the first deal with IBM to supply 2MB embedded flash drives for recording transportation data on public buses in South America.

Some time after SanDisk acquired M-Systems, they announced the end-of-life for the DiskOnChip 2000 product line in early 2007, suggesting customers migrate to the uDOC (uDiskOnChip Embedded USB Flash Disk) product, CompactFlash, or SecureDigital cards, all of which are not directly compatible, requiring interface redesign.

== TrueFFS ==
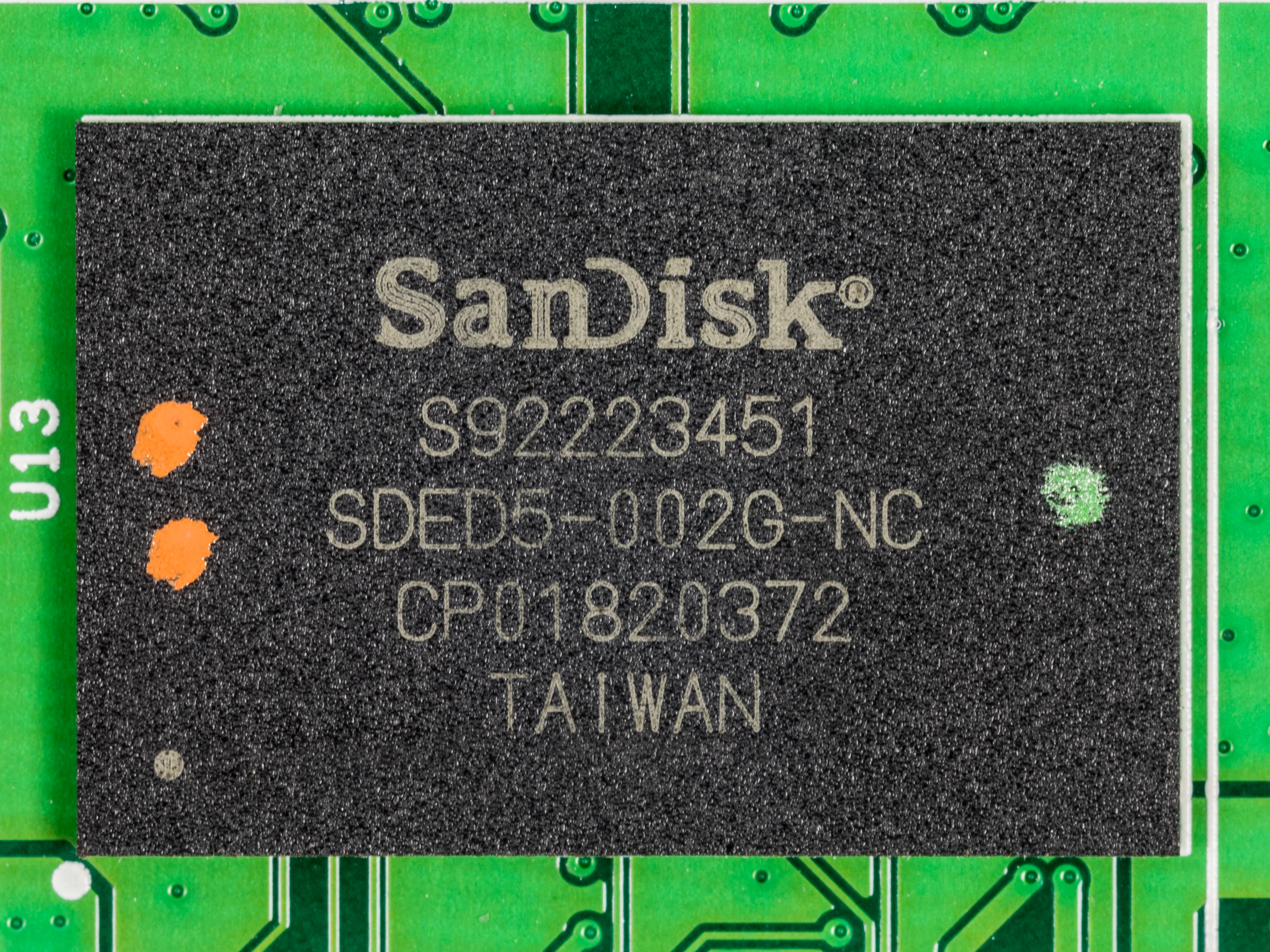
SanDisk SDED5-002G-NC - mDOC H3 Embedded Flash Drive (EFD) featuring Embedded TrueFFS Flash Management Software

The software that made the computer see the Flash memory as a disk drive was called TrueFFS and it was awarded US patent No. 5404485 in 1995. This software and initially the Flash memory from Toshiba were combined to form the first solid state storage product called DiskOnChip. The DiskOnChip was first designed for the Single Board Computer manufacturers and was a 2 MB chip. The DiskOnChip was made to work with TFFS and was able to bypass the BIOS by disabling the F000 address in the advance CMOS setup. Rick Iorillo lead the development and design efforts in the U.S. and established the first distributor base for the sale of the 28 pin DIP with Ampro being the first customer in the U.S. Sales of the DOC were established with IBM and Brazil to help in capturing the data off the public transportation systems.

== Corporate relationships ==
=== IBM ===
IBM was the first to market USB flash drives in North America, purchasing them from M-Systems and selling them under the IBM-brand label. These USB flash drives became available from IBM on December 15, 2000, and had a storage capacity of 8 MB, more than five times the capacity of the then-common floppy disks.

=== Samsung ===
M-Systems did not produce the Flash memory used in their devices. Instead they worked closely with other flash memory manufacturers to use multiple suppliers of memory. In July 1996, Samsung and M-Systems announced a cooperative agreement between them that would combine the Samsung NAND flash memory technology with the M-Systems' TrueFFS controller.

=== Toshiba ===
As early as 1998, Toshiba and M-Systems signed mutual agreements to develop and market a number of products for which Toshiba was a sole source. Toshiba agreed to supply a specific portion of its flash memory capacity to M-Systems in 2003. This included an investment by Toshiba in M-Systems.

=== Saifun Semiconductors ===
The relationship with Saifun Semiconductors included a US$10 million investment from M-Systems (25% of the total funding Saifun raised) to build products around Saifun's NROM technology.

=== SanDisk ===
M-systems was competing in the flash market with SanDisk, but the introduction of the USB drive made a cooperative environment more financially advantageous. In 2004, the two companies entered into a strategic agreement with cross licensing of patents to develop new USB drive platforms introduced in 2005. Ultimately M-Systems was acquired by SanDisk for an all-stock transaction worth US$1.55 billion. A definitive agreement was announced on July 30, 2006, for SanDisk to acquire M-Systems, and on November 19, 2006, the acquisition was complete.

== See also ==
- Netac Technology
- Pua Khein-Seng
