= Karl Küpfmüller =

German electrical engineer (1897–1977)

- Born: 6 October 1897; Nuremberg, German Empire
- Died: 26 December 1977 (aged 80); Darmstadt, West Germany
- Education: Ohm-Polytechnikum (today called: Georg-Simon-Ohm-Hochschule Nürnberg)
- Known for: Küpfmüller's uncertainty principle (1924); Nyquist–Shannon sampling theorem
- Awards: Werner von Siemens Ring (1968)
- Scientific career
- Fields: Electronic engineering
- Workplaces: Siemens, Danzig Institute of Technology, Technische Universität Berlin, Technische Hochschule Darmstadt

Karl Küpfmüller (6 October 1897 – 26 December 1977) was a German electrical engineer, who was prolific in the areas of communications technology, measurement and control engineering, acoustics, communication theory, and theoretical electro-technology.

== Biography ==
Küpfmüller was born in Nuremberg, where he studied at the Ohm-Polytechnikum. After returning from military service in World War I, he worked at the telegraph research division of the German Post in Berlin as a co-worker of Karl Willy Wagner, and, from 1921, he was lead engineer at the central laboratory of Siemens & Halske AG in the same city.

In 1928 he became full professor of general and theoretical electrical engineering at the Technische Hochschule in Danzig, and later held the same position in Berlin. Küpfmüller joined the National Socialist Motor Corps in 1933. In the following year he also joined the SA. In 1937 Küpfmüller joined the NSDAP and became a member of the SS, where he reached the rank of Obersturmbannführer.

Küpfmüller was appointed as director of communication technology Research & Development at the Siemens-Wernerwerk for telegraphy. In 1941–1945 he was director of the central R&D division at Siemens & Halske in 1937.

From 1952 until his retirement in 1963, he held the chair for general communications engineering at Technische Hochschule Darmstadt.

Later he was honorary professor at the Technische Hochschule Berlin. In 1968, he received the Werner von Siemens Ring for his contributions to the theory of telecommunications and other electro-technology.

He died at Darmstadt.

== Studies in communication theory ==
About 1928, he did the same analysis that Harry Nyquist did, to show that not more than 2B independent pulses per second could be put through a channel of bandwidth B hertz. He did this by quantifying the time-bandwidth product k of various communication signal types, and showing that k could never be less than 1/2. From his 1931 paper (rough translation from Swedish):

"The time law allows comparison of the capacity of each transfer method with various known methods. On the other hand it indicates the limits that the development of technology must stay within. One interesting question for example is where the lower limit for k lies. The answer is acquired by at least one power change being needed to achieve one signal. So the frequency range must be at least so wide that the settling time becomes less than the duration of a signal, and from this comes k=1/2. So we can never get below this value, no matter how technology develops."

== Textbooks by Küpfmüller ==
- K. Küpfmüller, Einführung in die theoretische Elektrotechnik [Introduction to the theory of electrical engineering]. Berlin: Julius Springer, 1932.
- K. Küpfmüller (revised and extended by W. Mathis and A. Reibiger), Theoretische Elektrotechnik: Eine Einführung [Theory of electrical engineering: An introduction], 19th ed. New York: Springer-Verlag, 2013.
- K. Küpfmüller "Die Systemtheorie der elektrischen Nachrichtenübertragung" S. Hirzel; 4., berichtigte Aufl edition (1974)
