= Küpfmüller's uncertainty principle =

Küpfmüller's uncertainty principle by Karl Küpfmüller in the year 1924 states that the relation of the rise time of a bandlimited signal to its bandwidth is a constant.

$$\Delta f\Delta t \ge k$$

with $k$ either $1$ or $\frac{1}{2}$

== See also ==
- Heisenberg's uncertainty principle
- Nyquist theorem
