= Modu =

Mobile phone company

- Industry: Telecommunications
- Founded: 1 January 2007
- Founder: Dov Moran
- Headquarters: Kfar Saba, Israel
- Area served: Israel and worldwide
- Services: Mobile phone services
- Number of employees: 130+
- Website: www.modumobile.com

Modu was an Israeli mobile phone company founded in 2007 by Dov Moran. The company invented the Modu, a modular cellular device which could be used in various other devices. Modu held the record for the world's lightest mobile phone, and it was the first modular cellphone. The Modu phone enabled users to personalize their mobile's looks and features by inserting it into a range of unique phone enclosures, known as Modu jackets. The jackets available were keyboard, sporty chassis, camera, and MP3 player.

It was launched in Israel in June 2009.

The headquartered of Modu was in Kfar Saba and it had over 130 employees. Engadget reported that Modu would cease operations in February 2011 as it attempted to pay back debts and salaries owed to its workers.

In mid-May 2011, Google acquired several Modu Mobile patents for $4.9 million. In 2013, Google-owned Motorola announced it was developing a modular phone called Project Ara.

== See also ==
- Economy of Israel
