= Electret microphone =

Type of microphone design

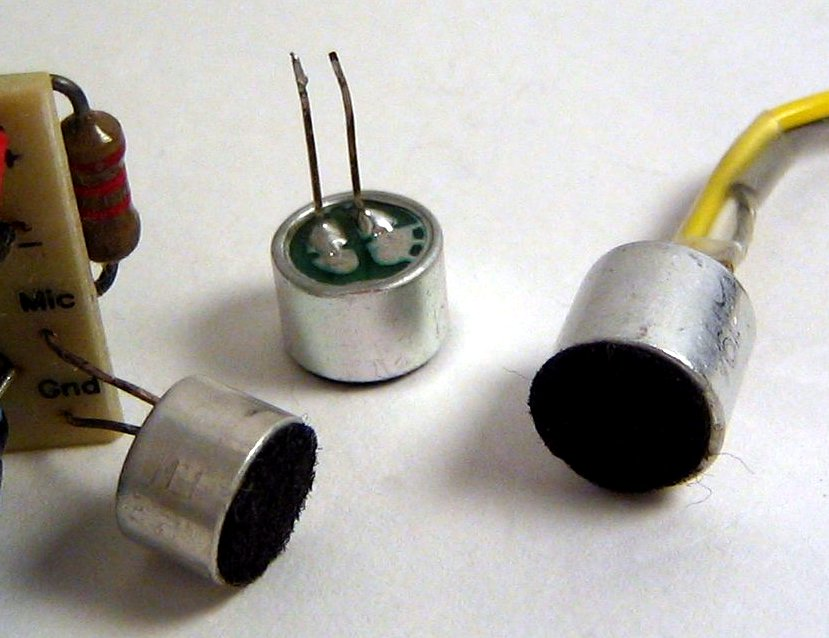
Electret microphone capsules

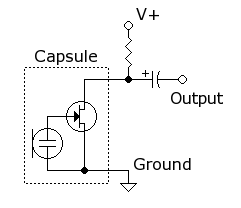
This typical electret microphone circuit has a common source configured JFET inside the two-terminal electret capsule. The JFET is externally-powered by the DC voltage V_{+} through a resistor which sets the gain and output impedance. The output audio signal is received though a DC blocking capacitor.

An electret microphone is a microphone whose diaphragm forms a capacitor (historically-termed a condenser) that incorporates an electret. The electret's permanent electric dipole provides a constant charge Q on the capacitor. Sound waves move the diaphragm, changing the capacitance C, which produces a corresponding voltage change across the capacitor of ΔV = Q/ΔC. The electret's constant charge eliminates the need for the polarizing power supply required for non-electret condenser microphones, though a preamplifier is typically incorporated to boost the audio voltage signal.

== Electret material ==
An electret is a stable dielectric material with a permanently-embedded electric dipole that persists for hundreds of years due to its high resistance and chemical stability. The name comes from electrostatic and magnet; drawing analogy to the formation of a magnet by alignment of magnetic domains in a piece of iron. Electrets are commonly made by first melting a suitable dielectric material such as a plastic or wax that contains polar molecules, and then allowing the dielectric to re-solidify in a powerful electrostatic field. The polar molecules of the dielectric align themselves to the direction of the electrostatic field, producing a permanent electrostatic "bias".

== History ==
Electret materials have been known since the 1920s and were proposed as condenser microphone elements several times, but they were considered impractical until the foil electret type was invented at Bell Laboratories in 1961 by Gerhard Sessler and James West, using a thin metallized Teflon foil. This became the most common type, used in many applications from high-quality recording and lavalier use to built-in microphones in small sound recording devices and telephones. Modern electret microphones use PTFE plastic, either in film or solute form, to form the electret.

== Types ==
There are three major types of electret microphones, differing in the way the electret material is used:

Foil-type or diaphragm-type
A film of electret material is used as the diaphragm itself. This is the most common construction. It is often considered the lowest quality, as the electret material used sometimes does not make a particularly good diaphragm. Modern materials have enabled very comparable performance to other designs.
Back electret
An electret film is applied to the back plate of the microphone capsule and the diaphragm is made of an uncharged material, which may be mechanically more suitable for the transducer design being realized.
Front electret
This design features no back plate, and the capacitor is formed by the diaphragm and the inside surface of the capsule. The electret film is adhered to the inside front cover and the metalized diaphragm is connected to the input of the FET (field-effect transistor). It is equivalent to the back electret in that any conductive film may be used for the diaphragm.

== Pre-amplifier power ==
Electret microphones require no polarizing voltage unlike other condenser microphones, but normally contain an integrated preamplifier which requires a small amount of power (often incorrectly called polarizing power or bias). This preamp is frequently phantom powered in sound reinforcement and studio applications.

For electret microphones in headsets and push-to-talk handsets, this is called plug-in power, and is provided through the audio jack via a resistor.

Other types include a 1.5 V battery in the microphone housing, which is often left permanently connected as the current drain is usually very small.
