= Auditory science =

Scientific study of hearing

Auditory science or hearing science is the scientific study of perception of sounds in humans and animals. It is an interdiscipline across acoustics, neuroscience, and psychology. It is often related to one or many of these other fields: psychophysics, psychoacoustics, audiology, physiology, otorhinolaryngology, speech science, automatic speech recognition, music psychology, linguistics, and psycholinguistics.

== History ==
Early auditory research included the early 19th century work of Georg Ohm and August Seebeck and their experiments and arguments about Fourier analysis of sounds. Later in the 19th century, German physicist Hermann von Helmholtz wrote Sensations of Tone describing the founding concepts of psychoacoustics, i.e. the relationship between the physical parameters of a sound and the percept that it induces.

Psychoacoutics is primarily interested in the basic workings of the ear and is, therefore, mostly studied using simple sounds like pure tones. In the 1950s, psychologists George A. Miller and J. C. R. Licklider furthered our knowledge in psychoacoustics and speech perception.

== Main scientific journals ==
- Acoustical Science and Technology
- Acta Acustica united with Acustica
- Audiology & Neurotology
- Cochlear Implants International
- Ear and Hearing
- Frontiers in Auditory Cognitive Neuroscience
- Hearing Research
- IEEE/ACM Transactions on Audio, Speech, and Language Processing
- International Journal of Audiology (IJA)
- Journal of Speech, Language and Hearing Research
- Journal of the American Academy of Audiology (JAAA)
- Journal of the Association for Research in Otolaryngology (JARO)
- Journal of the Audio Engineering Society
- Music Perception
- Otology & Neurotology
- Speech Communication
- The Journal of the Acoustical Society of America (JASA)
- Trends in Hearing

== Scientific associations and societies ==
=== International ===
- International Society of Audiology
- Acoustical Society of America
- Association for Research in Otolaryngology
- European Acoustics Association
- Nordic Audiological Society

=== National ===
- Société Française d'Acoustique (French Acoustical Society)
- Deutsche Gesellschaft für Akustik (German Acoustical Society)
- British Society of Audiology
- Nederlandse Vereniging voor Audiologie (Dutch Association for Audiology)
- Acoustical Society of Japan

=== Online resources ===
Many members of the auditory science community follow the auditory.org mailing list, known as "the Auditory List".

Global Audiology offers information on the practice of Audiology around the world and is maintained by the International Society of Audiology.
