= Dafydd Stephens =

Welsh doctor (1942–2012)

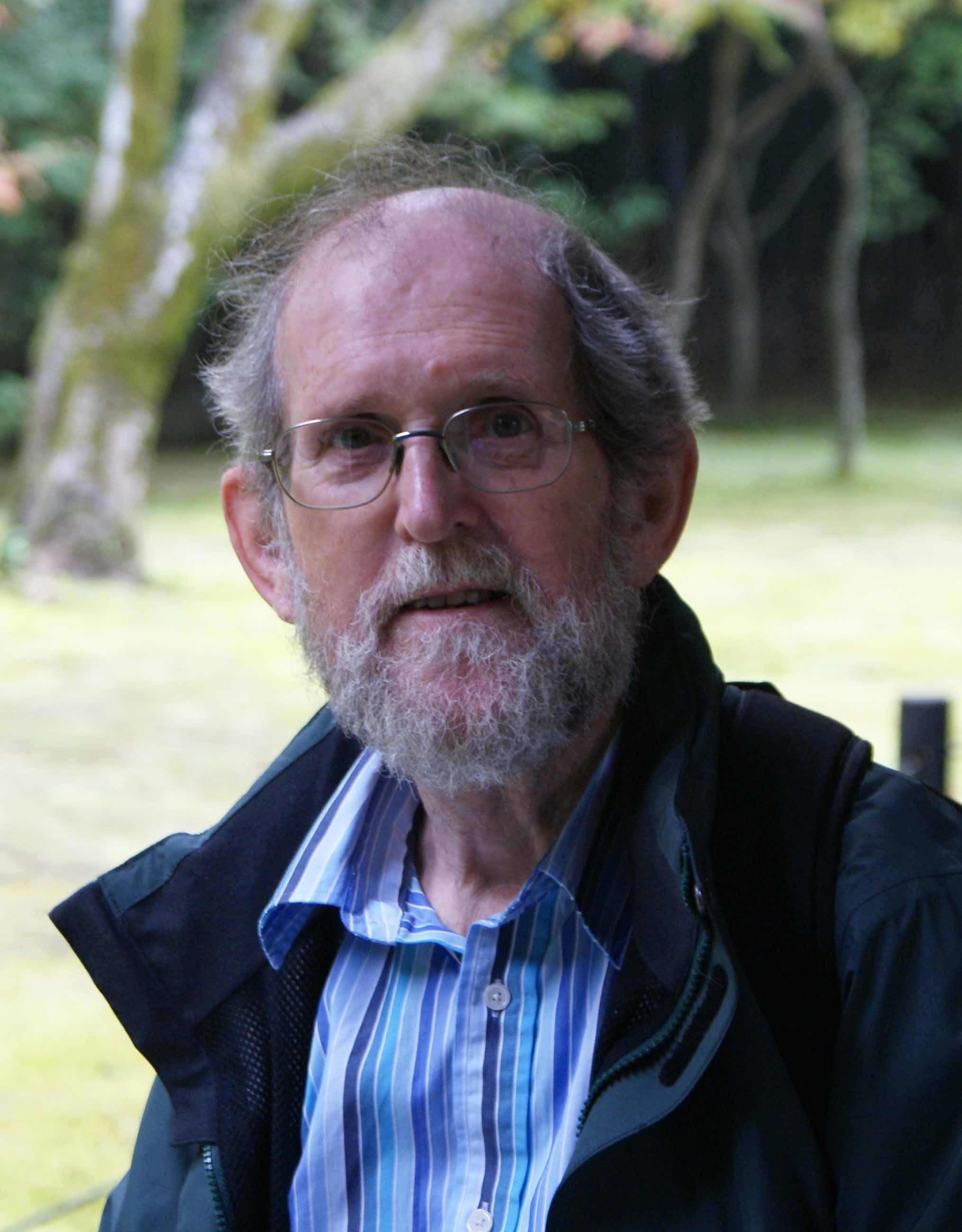
Dafydd Stephens

Dafydd Stephens (2 July 1942 – 2 July 2012) was an audiological physician, holding the post of Honorary Professor of Audiological Medicine at the Cardiff University School of Medicine at Cardiff University. He was also a visiting professor at Swansea University and the University of Bristol. He previously worked as a consultant audiological physician at the Welsh Hearing Institute, University Hospital of Wales.

== Life ==
The only son of teachers, he lived his early life in Purley, south of London, and took his medical training at Charing Cross Hospital, where he was an active cross country athlete; in 1965 he took part in the Ben Nevis Race. He was also a keen birdwatcher in his younger days, and retained an interest in the natural world throughout his life. He started his career in audiology as a research fellow at the University of Iowa in 1962, where he first met Ronald Hinchcliffe, who remained a friend throughout his life. His work took him to London, Cambridge, Southampton and Denmark before he took up a post as consultant in audiological medicine at the Royal National Throat Nose and Ear Hospital in 1976. In 1986 he moved back to his native Wales, becoming the director of the Welsh Hearing Institute as well as consulting his work as an audiological physician and lecturer.

== Work ==
Dr. Stephens wrote and edited several books and had scholarly articles published in more than 400 publications in peer-reviewed scientific journals and books. Over the years he served numerous professional bodies, committees and societies and he was one of the key people in establishing audiological medicine in the UK, having been appointed to the first post advertised in the specialty.

Though Stephens published his research in almost all the areas related to ear and hearing healthcare, he took special interest in genetic hearing impairments, the epidemiology of hearing loss, audiological enablement/rehabilitation, tinnitus and the History of Audiology. In audiological medicine, Professor Stephens was considered an authority in the field of genetic hearing impairment. In general, his work was mainly towards establishing more patient-centered and holistic approach to clinical practice.

Although he retired from clinical work in September 2005, he remained active in audiology, mainly in teaching and research and was involved in many multi-centre national and international studies. He was also actively involved in contributing to various international conferences around the World as an invited guest speaker. In addition, he was an editorial board member for various scientific journals including International Journal of Audiology (IJA), Audiological Medicine, Australian and New Zealand Journal of Audiology (ANZJA), International Journal of Qualitative Studies on Health and Well-Being . He also shared in founding the international Association of Physician in Audiology and was its first Honorary Secretary.

== Community work ==
Dafydd Stephens and his family settled in Llanmaes and after that he served for 25 years on the community council, and was chairman for four periods in that time.

== Death ==
Stephens died on Monday 2 July 2012.

== See also ==
List of Welsh medical pioneers
