= Anu Sharma =

American audiologist and academic

Anu Sharma is an American audiologist and academic. She is a professor in the Department of Speech, Language, and Hearing Science and a fellow at the Institute for Cognitive Science and Center for Neuroscience at University of Colorado Boulder. She is also an adjunct professor in the Department of Otolaryngology and Audiology at the University of Colorado Denver Medical School. Sharma received her doctorate at Northwestern University while working under Nina Kraus, PhD.

== Research ==
Sharma researches the impact of hearing loss on the brain. Her research includes examining the effects of auditory deprivation on development and re-organisation of the central auditory pathways, and on cross-modal compensatory plasticity from visual and somatosensory modalities. She also looks at the effects of intervention with hearing aids and cochlear implants on cortical plasticity and behavioural outcomes. Further, Sharma has an interest in neuroplasticity for both infants and young children and age-related hearing loss in older adults.

== Funding and publications ==
Sharma's research has been funded by National Institutes of Health (NIH) since 2001. Her work has been published in journals such as Hearing Research, PLOS ONE, Frontiers in Systems Neuroscience, Ear and Hearing, and Journal of Communication Disorders.
