= Tone decay test =

Hearing assessment

Human Ear

The tone decay test (also known as the threshold tone decay test or TTDT) is used in audiology to detect and measure auditory fatigue. It was developed by Raymond Carhart in 1957. In people with normal hearing, a tone whose intensity is only slightly above their absolute threshold of hearing can be heard continuously for 60 seconds. The tone decay test produces a measure of the "decibels of decay", i.e. the number of decibels above the patient's absolute threshold of hearing that are required for the tone to be heard for 60 seconds. A decay of between 15 and 20 decibels is indicative of cochlear hearing loss. A decay of more than 25 decibels is indicative of damage to the vestibulocochlear nerve.

== Procedure ==
A tone at the frequency of 4000 Hz is presented for 60 seconds at an intensity of 5 decibels above the patient's absolute threshold of hearing. If the patient stops hearing the tone before 60 seconds, the intensity level is increased by another 5 decibels with the procedure repeated until the tone can be heard for the full 60 seconds or until no decibel level can be found where the tone can be heard for the full 60 seconds. The resultant measure is given as the decibels of decay.

== Interpretation of TDT ==
TD is a procedure for diagnosing retro-cochlear pathology (RCP, damage to the auditory nerve). It is part of battery of tests that aim to differentiate between cochlear and retro-cochlear pathology. According to Rosenberg, 1958:

0-5 dB Decay - Normal or Conductive
10-15 dB Decay - Mild
20-25 dB Decay - Moderate
30->35 dB Decay - Marked Decay

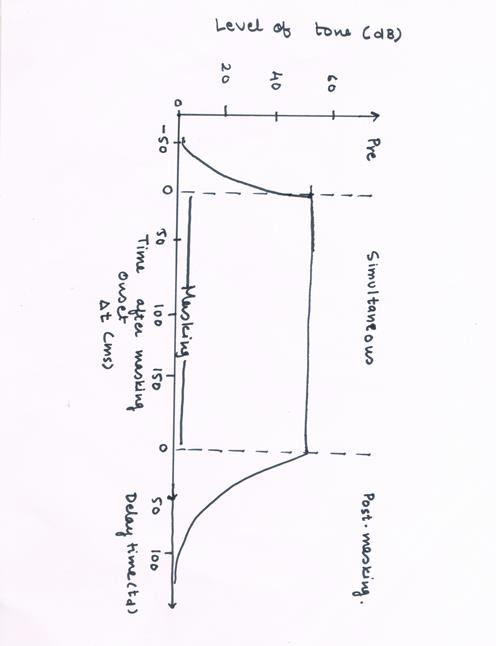
decay frequency vs time

Marked tone decay indicates probability of RCP. Glaslow, 1968 stated that positive TD is one where there is at least 30 dB decay. Tillman, 1969 agreed that patients with RCP, typically have TD exceeding 30 dB. However, at the same time it would be dangerous to assume that anyone with 30 dB decay, has RCP. While everyone with less than this amount, does not have. A more predictive way of looking at TD is that each dB of decay above 15 dB, should raise the suspicion that RCP lesion may exist. The greater the TD and the number of frequencies involved, particularly the low frequencies, and then there is greater possibility of serious pathology. The index of suspicion should also be raised if the rate of decay does not diminish with increased stimulus intensity. Patients with acoustic tumor, frequently exhibit extreme an often complete TD. However, tumor size appears to be related to the severity of symptoms. Partial or complete TD was found in 60% of tumors classified as large, while, 40% of tumor is classified as small.

Fowler noted that equal loudness between the recruiting impaired ear with normal ear can be achieved only with larger sensation levels (SLs) to the normal ear. E.g. A tone at SL of 60 dB in normal ear and 30 dB in impaired ear may sound equally loud. This result suggests that the growth of loudness requiring an intensity increase of 60 dB in normal ear is achieved with an intensity increase of 30 dB in impaired ear. This indicates that recruitment for loudness growth must be occurring much more in impaired ear. This is due to abnormality in cochlea such as hypersensitivity of haircells due to damage. Recruitment is a landmark feature of SNHL of cochlear origin. Reverse Recruitment / Decruitment is a hallmark feature of SNHL of Retro Cochlear region. When recruitment is found to be associated with presence of cochlear pathology then the recruitment is known as complete recruitment. When the recruitment is associated with cochlea then the concept is known as Partial Recruitment.

=== Advantages ===
- Low cost and general accessibility

=== Disadvantages ===
- The Pathophysiology behind tone decay is not very well known. The actual value of any tone decay procedure in accurately identifying 8 cranial nerve pathology has not been extensively investigated
