= Robert Beiny =

British hearing aid audiologist

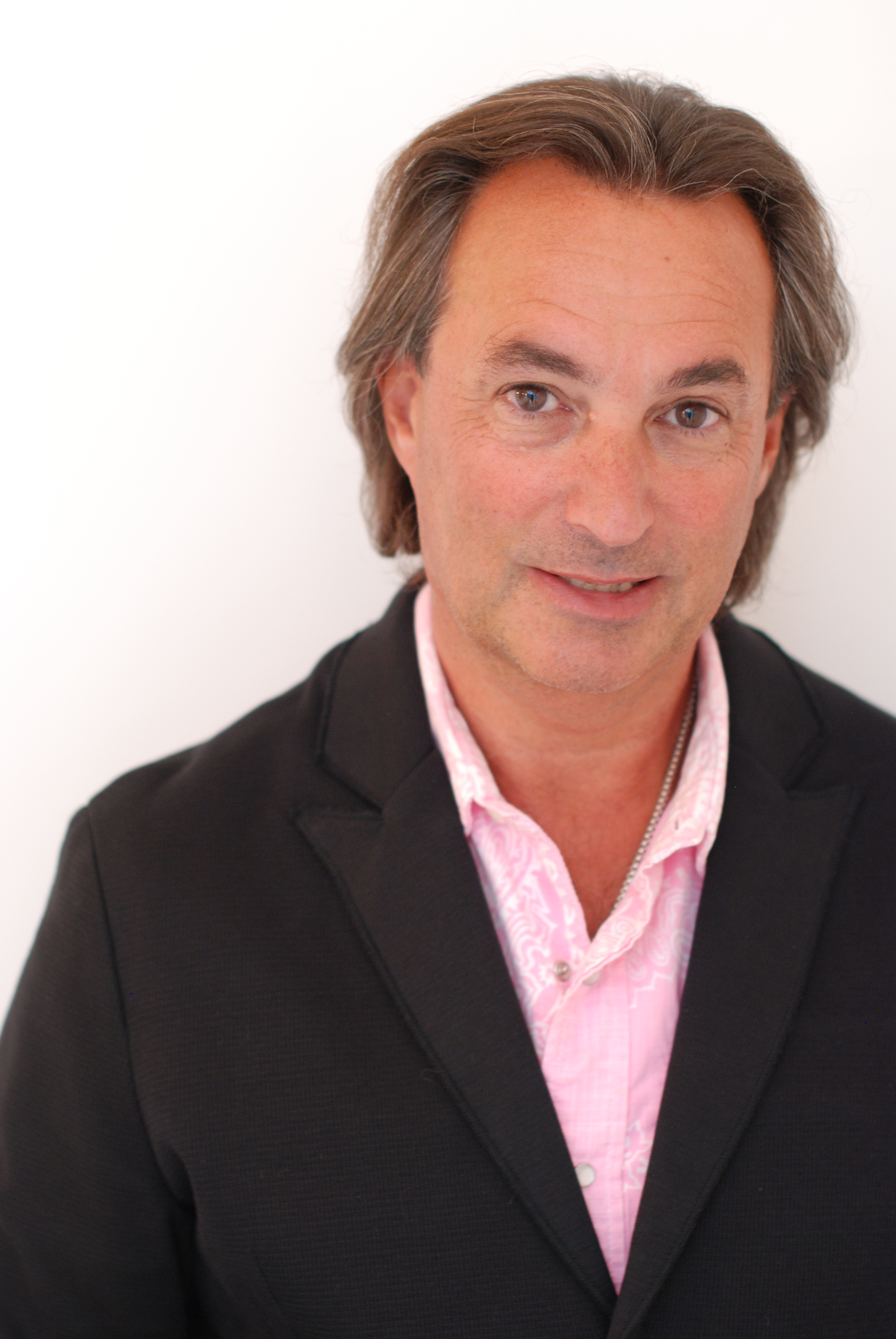
- Born: 3 January 1958 (age 68) London, UK
- Occupation: Hearing aid audiologist
- Citizenship: British

Robert Beiny (born 3 January 1958) is a British hearing aid audiologist based in Harpenden, Hertfordshire, UK.

== Career ==
Beiny joined the Central London Hearing Centre in 1976, where he developed an interest in the hearing, speech, and language development challenges of hearing-impaired young children. His career allowed him to travel, lecture, and provide audiological support to children and adults with hearing loss.

A career change saw him based at London's Nomis Studios (1984–86) while the Live Aid production was underway, working as an artist liaison and providing audiological advice on hearing protection to major musical artists.

Beiny acts as a spokesperson on matters related to hearing healthcare and hearing protection and appears regularly on TV and radio. He established his Hertfordshire-based clinic, Hearing Healthcare Practice, in 1993.

He acts as an adviser to hearing aid manufacturers, helping to shape product developments, and was selected by Phonak to launch Lyric hearing aids in 2010.

== Awards and recognition ==
Beiny is the three-times winner of the UK Audiologist of the Year (2009, 2011, 2017) and twice winner of the European Audiologist of the Year (2009, 2017).

He is a Fellow of the British Society of Hearing Aid Audiologists, a co-founder and past Chair of The Association of Independent Hearing Healthcare Professionals, a member of the British Society of Audiology, a member of the British Academy of Audiology, and a member of the Royal Society of Health.

In November 2023, Robert was the subject of an article in The Times by Hunter Davies. and is the subject of a chapter of Davies' book, 'Letters to Margaret'.
