= Brian Moore (scientist) =

Brian C.J. Moore FRS FMedSci
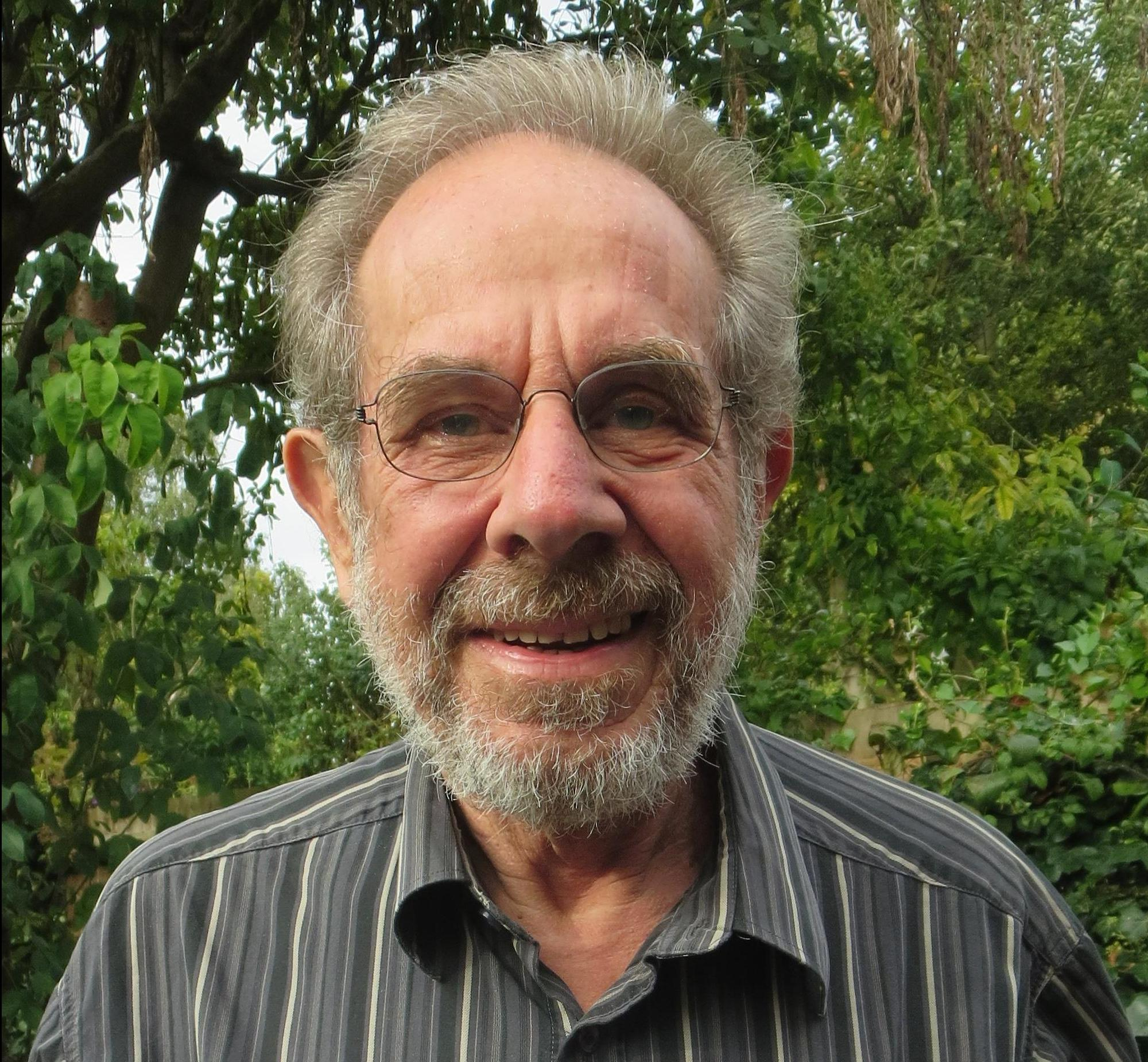
- Brian Moore in 2017
- Born: February 10, 1946 (age 80); London, England
- Education: St Catharine's College, Cambridge
- Scientific career
- Fields: Psychology; Psychoacoustics; Speech perception; Audiology
- Workplaces: University of Cambridge; Wolfson College, Cambridge

Brian C.J. Moore FMedSci, FRS (born 10 February 1946) is an Emeritus Professor of Auditory Perception in the University of Cambridge and an Emeritus Fellow of Wolfson College, Cambridge. His research focuses on psychoacoustics, audiology, and the development and assessment of hearing aids (signal processing and fitting methods).

Moore is a fellow of the Royal Society, the Academy of Medical Sciences, the Acoustical Society of America, the Audio Engineering Society, the British Society of Audiology, the Association for Psychological Science, and the Belgian Society of Audiology, and the British Society of Hearing Aid Audiologists. He has written or edited 21 books and over 750 scientific papers and book chapters.

== Education ==
Moore studied Natural Sciences at St Catharine's College, Cambridge, obtaining his BA in 1968. In 1971 he was awarded a Ph.D. in Experimental Psychology on the topic of Pitch Perception.

== Career ==
Moore was a Lecturer in Psychology at the University of Reading from 1971 to 1977, spending the year 1973-74 as a Fulbright-Hays Senior Scholar and Visiting Professor at the Department of Psychology, Brooklyn College of the City University of New York. In 1977 he was appointed University Lecturer in Experimental Psychology at the University of Cambridge where he was subsequently appointed Reader (1989) and Professor (1995). He became Emeritus Professor in 2014. He was appointed as Fellow of Wolfson College in 1983 and is now an Emeritus Fellow.

Moore has been an associate editor of the Journal of the Acoustical Society of America, Auditory Neuroscience, Hearing Research, the International Journal of Audiology, Otology and Neuro-Otology, and Trends in Hearing. He was president of the Association of Independent Hearing Healthcare Professionals (UK) from 1994-2021.

== Research ==
In his early career in the 1970s, Moore was mainly interested in fundamental research on loudness and pitch perception, masking effects, and speech recognition. He started to consider the practical aspects and potential applications of this research in the 1980s with his work on a 2-channel compression hearing aid. Other examples of practical applications include the development of a new loudness model that eventually became an international (ISO) standard, and the implementation of models of sound quality applicable to mobile telephones and other devices with Nokia.

More recently, he has been involved in the diagnosis and quantification of noise-induced hearing loss (NIHL), especially NIHL sustained during military service. He has also been involved in the development and evaluation of signal processing for hearing aids based on deep neural networks.

Moore has written or edited several influential books on hearing. His text book An Introduction to the Psychology of Hearing has been cited over 7600 times and has been translated into Japanese, Polish, Korean, and Chinese. Other books include Cochlear hearing Loss and Auditory Processing of Temporal Fine Structure: Effects of Age and Hearing Loss.

=== Pitch perception ===
Moore was one of the first researchers to present convincing evidence for the role of phase locking (the synchronization of nerve spikes to individual cycles of the filtered stimulus in the cochlea) in the perception of pitch. He showed that the ability of human listeners to detect small changes in frequency of brief tones was too good to be accounted for by a place mechanism of pitch for frequencies up to about 4 kHz. Together with Stephan Ernst he later showed that the ability to detect small changes in frequency worsened with increasing frequency from 2 to 8 kHz, consistent with the roll-off in the precision of phase-locking information at high frequencies, and then reached a plateau, consistent with a transition to a place mechanism. Together with Aleksander Sek he showed that phase locking to the temporal fine structure of complex tones contributes to the perception of pitch up to higher frequencies than previously assumed and that the detection of frequency modulation for low modulation rates also probably depends on phase locking.

=== Loudness perception and modelling ===
Moore together with Brian Glasberg, Thomas Baer and Michael Stone developed a model for predicting the loudness of sounds by extending and modifying the earlier models of Fletcher and Munson and of Zwicker and Scharf. The model proposed by Moore and co-workers formed the basis for an American National Standard and an ISO standard. An extension of the model to deal with time-varying sounds is under consideration as an ISO standard (ISO532-3, 2020). The loudness model of Moore and colleagues has been extended to predict loudness for people with hearing loss and this has been used to develop methods of fitting hearing aids.

=== Hearing aid design and fitting ===
Moore collaborated in the development and evaluation of multi-channel compression hearing aids intended to compensate for the loudness recruitment experienced by most hearing-impaired people. He and his colleagues developed a dual-time-constant automatic gain control system that has been widely used in hearing aids and cochlear implants.

=== Diagnostic tests of hearing ===
Moore and colleagues developed the Threshold Equalizing Noise (TEN) test for diagnosing dead regions in the cochlea; these are regions with very few or no functioning inner hair cells, synapses or neurons. The outcomes of the TEN test are relevant to the fitting of hearing aids and cochlear implants. The TEN test has been incorporated in the audiometers of several major manufacturers. Brian Moore also contributed to the development of tests for assessing monaural and binaural sensitivity to the temporal fine structure of sounds. These tests have been widely used in research and clinical studies.

=== Auditory scene analysis ===
Moore and colleagues were among the first to demonstrate the role of harmonicity in auditory scene analysis: simultaneous sinewaves that form a harmonic series are heard as a single sound object, but if a single sinewave is mistuned slightly from the harmonic series it “pops out” as a separate sound object. Moore and colleagues also showed that for rapid sequences of pure tones with alternating frequencies, the fission boundary (the frequency separation between successive tones at which they can no longer be heard as two separate streams) is constant across a wide range of centre frequencies when expressed on the ERB_{N}-number scale developed in Moore's laboratory.

=== Effects of hearing loss and age on speech perception ===
Moore and colleagues have conducted several studies examining the relationship between psychoacoustic abilities and speech perception by people with cochlear hearing loss and older people. They have shown that difficulties in speech perception are at least partly linked to reduced sensitivity to the temporal fine structure of sounds. Deficits in the processing of temporal fine structure are associated with increasing age even when audiometric thresholds remain normal.

== Awards and honors ==
- 1983 Thomas Simm Littler prize of the British Society of Audiology for the book “An Introduction to the Psychology of Hearing”.
- 1997 Appointed an Honorary Member of the Belgian Society of Audiology in recognition of “outstanding contributions to the field of audiology”.
- 1999 Elected an Honorary Fellow of the British Society of Hearing Aid Audiologists in recognition of “outstanding contributions to audiology”.
- 2001 Elected a Fellow of the Academy of Medical Sciences (FMedSci).
- 2002 Elected a Fellow of the Royal Society of London (FRS).
- 2003 Silver Medal in Physiological and Psychological Acoustics from the Acoustical Society of America.
- 2004 International Award in Hearing from the American Academy of Audiology.
- 2006 Thomas Simm Littler prize of the British Society of Audiology for the best academic contribution to audiology.
- 2008 Award of Merit from the Association for Research in Otolaryngology.
- 2008 Hugh Knowles Prize for Distinguished Achievement from the Hugh Knowles Center for Clinical and Basic Science in Hearing and Its Disorders.
- 2013 Thomas Simm Littler lectureship of the British Society of Audiology.
- 2014 Gold Medal from the Acoustical Society of America “For leadership in research on human hearing and its clinical applications”.
- 2015 Awarded a Doctorate Honoris Causa from Adam Mickiewicz University, Poznan, Poland.
- 2016 Elected a Fellow of the Audio Engineering Society in recognition of “significant contributions to the understanding of human auditory perception, particularly in relation to sound reproduction and hearing aids”
- 2019 Appointed a Principal Fellow of the British Society of Audiology.
- 2021 Received the Life Achievement Award of the American Auditory Society.

== See also ==
- Equivalent rectangular bandwidth
- Equal-loudness contour
- Temporal envelope and fine structure
