= IJA =

IJA may refer to:

- Imperial Japanese Army
- International Journal of Astrobiology
- International Jugglers' Association
- International Journal of Audiology
- International Juridical Association (1931–1942)
