= Harvey Dillon =

Australian expert in auditory science and linguistics

Harvey Albert Dillon AO is an Australian expert in auditory science and linguistics.

Dillon did research for many years at the Australian National Acoustic Laboratories (NAL), where he was appointed Director in 2000. From 1991 to 2007, Dillon was also a deputy director of the Cooperative Research Centre for Cochlear Implant and Hearing Aid Innovations. While at NAL, Dillon created, jointly with Denis Byrne, the Client Oriented Scale of Improvement (COSI) questionnaire for guiding improvements in hearing ability. In 2016, while Director at NAL, Dillon was awarded the Aram Glorig Award ‘for lifelong dedication to Audiology and in recognition of his achievements for the science and practice of Audiology’ at the World Congress of Audiology held in Vancouver.

In 2003, the American Academy of Audiology (AAA) gave Dillon a Research Achievement Award for significant impact in the field of audiology/hearing research.

in 2013, the Callier Center for Communication Disorders at the University of Texas at Dallas awarded Dillon its biennial Callier Prize in Communication Disorders.

In 2018, Dillon was made an Officer of the Order of Australia for "distinguished service to science, and to engineering, as a researcher in the field of hearing loss assessment, electrophysiology, and rehabilitation, and to improved auditory technologies."

Dillon is a professor in the Department of Linguistics at Macquarie University. He is a Fellow at the International Collegium of Rehabilitative Audiology (ICRA).

According to the ABC, Dillon is the author of the widely used textbook Hearing Aids.
