= Leo Doerfler =

American audiologist (1919–2004)

Leo G. Doerfler (1919–2004) was the founder of the profession of audiology, the science of hearing and hearing disorders, in the early 1940s. He played a leading role in establishing professional bodies and educational standards for audiology practitioners.

== Early life ==
Born June 25, 1919, in New York City to Anna (Steiner) and Gustav Doerfler, he earned degrees in English literature from New York University and Columbia, but then accepted a scholarship at the Central Institute for the Deaf (CID) and earned his master's degree in deaf education. At CID, he also met Alice Turechek, a young teacher of the deaf, who was to be his wife for nearly 57 years until her death in 2000.

In 1941, Doerfler took a job at the Iowa School for the Deaf, then enlisted in the army in 1942. In 1943, the day before he was to be sent to Germany, Doerfler was assigned to be an acoustic officer at Deshon General Hospital in Butler, Pennsylvania. There, he and three others treated soldiers with hearing loss. They were soon joined by Raymond Carhart, and the work they did during the war helped lay the foundation for audiology.

== Establishing audiology ==
Acting on Carhart's advice, Doerfler pursued a doctorate in audiology at Northwestern University, becoming only the second person ever to receive a PhD in this field, after which he established an audiology program at the University of Pittsburgh and served as its director for 28 years. He went on to co-develop the well-known Doerfler Stewart Test for pseudohypacusis (non-organic hearing loss). He joined the American Speech-Language-Hearing Association (ASHA) where he served on the executive council, was later elected vice-president and, in 1967, president. As the first chairman of the American Board of Examiners in Speech Pathology and Audiology, he guided ASHA's efforts to accredit audiology programs.

== Academy of Dispensing Audiologists ==
In 1976, at age 57, he left academia to start a private dispensing audiology practice in Greensburg, Pennsylvania, outside of Pittsburgh. In 1977, he and seven like-minded audiologists, met in Colorado Springs, Colorado, where they launched the Academy of Dispensing Audiologists. He was elected president and presided over the first ADA convention in 1978. He became an early leader in the movement to establish the "AuD" (Doctor of Audiology).

Writing on ADA's web site, he recalled that tumultuous time: "My academic friends did not support the concept of the ADA and let me know at ASHA conventions and through the mail. Most are now dispensing, although none ever admitted being wrong."

== Supreme Court ruling ==
The 1978 Supreme Court ruling in National Society of Professional Engineers versus the United States forced ASHA to lift its ban on dispensing, and Doerfler resumed being active in ASHA. In the 1980s, he fought to have ASHA recognize audiology as a separate profession from speech pathology, and later urged ASHA to endorse the AuD. He lost those battles at the time, but lived to see the association reverse its position on both issues.

== Later life ==
Doerfler helped establish the Audiology Co-Op, one of the earliest buying groups, and served as its first president and later chairman of its board. In 1988, he was one of the 31 audiologists who joined James Jerger, PhD, in founding the American Academy of Audiology (AAA).

In 1988, he and 24 other audiologists attended the ADA-sponsored Conference on Professional Education in Chicago, where the campaign for the professional doctorate truly began. Afterwards, he helped create a model curriculum for the AuD and served on the board of the Audiology Foundation of America.

Doerfler died on July 7, 2004 in Oyster Bay Cove, New York.

== Recognition ==
Doerfler received many honors and awards, including AAA's first "Career Award in Hearing" in 1994, and ADA's 1991 Wernick Award in recognition of outstanding educational contributions. ADA created the Leo G. Doerfler Award to honor excellence in clinical practice.
