= Extended-wear hearing aid =

An extended-wear hearing aid is a type of hearing aid that is placed deep in the ear canal and can be worn for several months at a time without removal. This type of hearing aid is primarily suited for people who have mild to moderately severe hearing loss. This new hearing aid concept was invented by Adnan Shennib, founder of InSound Medical, Inc.

The location of these aids directly in the ear canal can provide reduced distortion, wind noise, occlusion and feedback as well as better sound directionality and quality compared to other hearing aids.

== Use and operation ==
Extended wear hearing aids are made of a soft material designed to contour to each user's ear canal, with a range of canal width sizes to accommodate ear dimensions. An ENT physician, audiologist or hearing aid specialist non-surgically inserts the device into the ear, placing it in the bony portion of the ear canal ~4 mm from the tympanic membrane, or eardrum. The specific placement in the ear canal is said to provide an overall increase in gain and output, greater headroom, reduced occlusion effect, reduced feedback and improved directionality. Once inserted, users can change the volume and settings using a magnetic adjustment tool.

It is recommended that a hearing specialist remove an extended wear hearing aid when the battery dies and the device needs to be replaced, but most hearing professionals provide patients with a removal loop tool to allow for self-removal should it be necessary.

== Suitability ==
As with other hearing devices, compatibility is based on an individual's hearing loss, ear size and shape, medical conditions, and lifestyle. This can be determined by visiting a hearing aid specialist.

== Durability ==
Extended-wear hearing aids are built to withstand moisture and cerumen (ear wax) and can be worn while exercising, showering, etc. The longevity of extended wear hearing aids is affected by usage patterns, environmental differences, and the lifestyle of each user.
