= KHRI =

Khri or KHRI may refer to:

- Santari Khri, a High Republic Jedi master in the 2023 video game Star Wars Jedi: Survivor
- Khri ma lod (died 712), a ruler of the Tibetan Empire
- KHRI (FM), a radio station (90.7 FM) licensed to Hollister, California, United States
- Kresge Hearing Research Institute, an Otolaryngology school at the University of Michigan at Ann Arbor, Michigan, United States
- the ICAO code for Hermiston Municipal Airport, in Hermiston, Oregon, United States
