= Doerfler =

Doerfler is a surname. Notable people with the surname include:

- Christian Doerfler (1862–1934), Justice of the Wisconsin Supreme Court
- John Francis Doerfler (born 1964), American Roman Catholic bishop
- Leo Doerfler (1919–2004), American Audiologist

== See also ==
- Dörfler
