= Marion Downs (audiologist) =

American audiologist (1914–2014)

- Born: January 26, 1914; New Ulm, Minnesota, U.S.
- Died: November 13, 2014 (aged 100); Dana Point, California, U.S.

Marion Downs (January 26, 1914 – November 13, 2014) was an American audiologist and professor emerita at the University of Colorado Health Sciences Center in Denver. She pioneered universal newborn hearing screening in the early 1960s and spent over 30 years advocating for its adoption in hospitals, as well as for the provision of hearing aids to infants displaying hearing loss. Her efforts were aimed at raising awareness within the medical community about the developmental challenges associated with childhood deafness. Thanks to her initiatives, 95 percent of newborns born in America today undergo screening for hearing loss. As a result of her efforts, 95 percent of all newborns in America today are screened for hearing loss. She devoted her professional life to the promotion of early identification of hearing loss in newborns, infants, and young children and to helping deaf and hard of hearing individuals lead fulfilling lives.

== Early life ==
She was born and raised in New Ulm, Minnesota. After her junior year of college, she married George Downs, PhD, and the couple had three children

== Career ==
Downs attended the University of Minnesota (UM) until 1934, and in 1948 finished her course requirements at the University of Colorado. She received the bachelor's degree in political science and English from UM. In 1949, she enrolled in graduate school at the University of Denver (DU) and received her master's degree in audiology in 1951. She promptly went to work at DU, teaching audiology and directing the audiology clinic from 1951 to 1959. At DU, she supervised a contract with the Veteran's Administration, doing all the veterans' speech pathology, audiology, and hearing aid assessments.

In 1959, she began working as an audiologist in a new ear-nose-and-throat (ENT, or otolaryngology) clinic at the University of Colorado School of Medicine. There, along with Doreen Pollack, she initiated the practice of fitting hearing aids on infants by the age of six months, on the theory that the earlier the remediation and prevention, the better the functioning would be. At the time, most children did not receive hearing aids until two or three years of age. In 1962, she developed an observational test on newborns, which she reported in 1964. Scientific neurological reports confirmed the early remediation theory in the late 1980s and 1990s. Downs worked at the clinic until retiring in 1982. She published two books and over 100 articles on the subject, and lectured and taught extensively throughout the United States and overseas.

In 1969, she proposed that a national committee be established, composed of representatives from professional hearing healthcare organizations, to periodically review and evaluate as well as recommend a "best practices" approach to newborn hearing screening. This led to the formation that year of the National Joint Committee on Infant Hearing, which has provided multidisciplinary leadership and guidance in all areas of newborn and infant hearing issues ever since.

== Publications ==
Downs co-authored Hearing in Children (five editions with Lippincott Williams & Wilkins, and sixth edition with Plural Publishing ) with J. L. Northern — textbook for audiology students on how to evaluate and manage children with hearing impairments. The book has been translated into several foreign languages. She also coauthored Auditory Disorders in School Children with R. Roeser (Thieme), now in its fourth edition.

In 2007, Downs published Shut Up and Live! A 93-Year-Old's Guide to Living to a Ripe Old Age, an exhortation for triumphing over age, with the outline: laugh, exercise, love and enjoy sex, rebel against your aches and pains, and live out your passions.

== Bibliography ==
Northern and Downs (2014). Hearing in Children (Sixth ed.). San Diego, Plural Publishing, Inc. Previous editions in 1974, 1978, 1984, 1991, and 2002.

Auditory Disorders in School Children: Identification, Remediation (co-editor) (1988).
Auditory Disorders in School Children: The Law, Identification, Remediation (co-editor) (1981; 4th edition, 2004).
Shut Up and Live! A 93-Year-Old's Guide to Living to a Ripe Old Age (2007).

== Honors and awards ==
The Marion Downs Hearing Center was named in Downs' honor and opened in May 2005 on the campus of the University of Colorado Medical Center. She was inducted into the Colorado Women's Hall of Fame in 2006, and in 2007 received the Secretary's Highest Recognition Award at the U.S. Department of Health and Human Services for her groundbreaking work and lifetime dedication promoting the early identification of hearing problems in children.

Downs has received two honorary doctorate degrees: a Doctor of Science from the University of Colorado and a Doctor of Human Services from the University of Northern Colorado. The University of Colorado's School of Medicine awarded her the Gold Medal Recognition. The University of Minnesota gave her its Outstanding Achievement Award.

She was awarded the Medal of the Ministry of Health of South Vietnam, and was recognized with honors from nearly every professional hearing-related society including the American Academy of Audiology, the American Speech-Language-Hearing Association, and the American Academy of Otolaryngology–Head and Neck Surgery. She was a founder of the American Auditory Society and invited to present the Carhart Memorial Lecture in 1980. She received an Outstanding Service Recognition Award from the American Medical Association for her work in teaching audiology in Vietnam. She was among the early members of the International Audiology Society, and served on numerous committees, boards, and task forces on local, national, and international projects. She served as the program chair for the International Audiology Congress on two occasions.

== Other activities ==
She skied until she was 94, played tennis regularly, and won five gold medals for tennis in the National Senior Games. She turned 100 in January 2014.
