= Hearing, Balance and Communication =

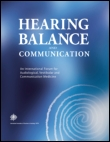
- Discipline: Audiology
- Language: English

Publication details
- Former name(s): Audiological Medicine
- History: 2003–present
- Publisher: Taylor and Francis Group (UK)
- Frequency: Quarterly

Standard abbreviations
- ISO 4: Hear. Balance Commun.
- NLM: Hearing Balance Commun

Indexing
- ISSN: 2169-5717 (print); 2169-5725 (web)
- LCCN: 2003243423
- OCLC no.: 56974446

Links
- Journal homepage

Hearing, Balance and Communication is a peer-reviewed medical journal covering the field of hearing, balance and communication disorders. It is the official journal of the International Association of Physicians in Audiology, as well as the British, Swedish, and Danish Associations of Audiological Physicians and the Società Italiana di Audiologia. It was known as the Journal of Audiological Medicine from 1992 to 2002 and as Audiological Medicine from 2003 to 2013. Hearing, Balance and Communication has been published quarterly by Taylor and Francis Group since 2003 and is edited by Alessandro Martini (Ferrara, Italy). It is indexed in PsycINFO.
