= Global Audiology =

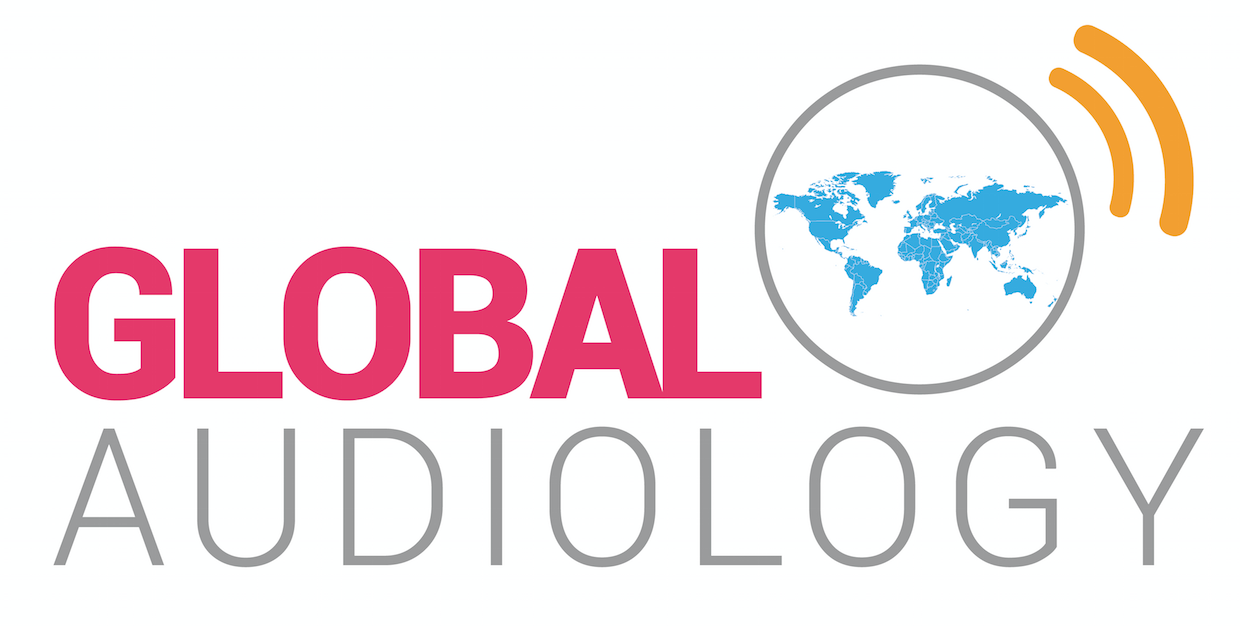
Logo

Global Audiology is an open access platform designed to enhance understanding of audiology education and practice worldwide. Despite the global and individual burden of hearing disorders the World Health Organization (WHO) reported a substantial gap between the need and access to hearing care services, particularly in low- and middle-income countries. Among several audiological services that can be provided, it is estimated that only 17% of those who can benefit from a hearing aid have access to one. The WHO report emphasizes the importance of integrating ear and hearing care into national health plans to achieve universal health care coverage.

Lack of information among those who need audiology care exacerbates the poor availability of services. Global Audiology goals include facilitating networking among hearing health providers and users, and promoting the development of audiology services in resource-limited settings. By developing knowledge about current practice trends, the initiative aims to standardize audiology practices, improve audiological care, and increase access to audiology services. In addition, it aims to facilitate research collaborations between countries.

The Global Audiology initiative is a collaborative effort to create a comprehensive and up-to-date resource for audiology information worldwide. It relies on committed volunteers for the development and management of the content. The Global Audiology working group within the International Society of Audiology (ISA), with input from the ISA Executive Committee members, developed the project structure and processes. The Global Audiology Working Group moderates the content within the Wikiversity pages. The information for the country-specific page is created by volunteers. Anyone can edit to develop the information further and ensure the content is accurate and up-to-date, and guidance is provided.

== History ==
The project started in 2016 with the launch of a website called Global Resource for Audiology Information Networking (GRAIN). It included content on the practice of audiology provided from volunteers across the globe. In 2019 the Global Audiology initiative was endorsed by ISA which assumed its management. The content from the GRAIN website was moved to Wikiversity. The move was motivated by a desire to provide mechanisms to facilitate input from communities of interest.

== See also ==
- Audiology
- Computational Audiology
- Hearing
- International Society of Audiology
- Sound
