= Audioprosthology =

Audioprosthology is the profession of the fitting of a hearing aid, or auditory prosthesis. An audioprosthologist is defined as “an aid-fitting specialist who has completed a course in audioprosthology.” This term was adopted by a group of hearing instrument specialists and the International Hearing Society (IHS) in 1976. The American Conference on Audioprosthology (ACA) sponsored courses in audioprosthology until 2016. Currently, the American Conference of Audioprosthology program is being revamped for distance learning.

== Definition ==
The roots of the term make its definition self-explanatory: audio for hearing, prosthetic for device, and ology for science. “Audio” as used in both “audiology” and “audioprosthology,” is derived from the Latin term “audire,” which means “to hear,” and is commonly used in numerous other English words that are related in varying ways to hearing and sound. Audioprosthology was originally formed by the International Hearing Society (IHS).

Audioprosthologists, Audiologists, and Hearing Instrument Specialists provide services and testing for hearing aids and hearing loss. All are required from each individual state to pass certain requirements and regulations, most of which the same practical exam must be taken by Audioprosthologists, Audiologists and Hearing Instrument Specialists. Doctors of Audiology can diagnose but still cannot prescribe any type of medication because their Doctorate is not a medical degree. Audioprosthologists can also work in private practice or Doctors offices.

== Origins ==
Founded in 1976 by Harold Williams, EdD, and Robert Briskey, the ACA program was developed in response to a need for advanced training for hearing instrument specialists. The name was believed to be an accurate description of the course of study – the application of prostheses, that is hearing aids, to ameliorate auditory impairments. The first graduates of the program in 1978 realized the benefits of the coursework immediately and recommended that the ACA program be offered nationwide. In 1993 the International Hearing Society (IHS) assumed control of the curriculum and applied to the American Council on Education (ACE) for an assessment of the program's university credit equivalence. ACE determined that completion of the ACA course of study was the equivalent of 15 upper level baccalaureate semester credits. That equivalency meant that colleges and universities that recognized the ACE credit-equivalence paradigm would accept those 15 credits toward an undergraduate degree. The ACA program was launched at sites across the U.S. and was offered regularly until the program went on indefinite hiatus in 2016.

Hearing aid specialists have typically learned their profession through an apprenticeship in that they're trained and supervised by another licensed individual. When qualified they take their state's examination, and upon passing, they're granted a license to practice. This apprenticeship provides them with the skill set necessary for entry level, safe practice. The original intent of the ACA Program was to provide current practitioners with the scientific foundation for their vocation, thus taking them to an advanced practice designation through formal coursework, laboratory exercises, and summative examinations.

== Purpose ==
The ACA Program is an opportunity for adult learners to supplement their skill set with the knowledge and theoretical background that could move them to a higher level of proficiency and professionalism, that is, to an advanced practice status. The use of the term audioprosthologist is a privilege of successful completion of the course of study. An individual must complete and pass a 13-month course and a subsequent practicum prior to being granted this privilege.

The intent of the American Council on Education (ACE) process was to provide an opportunity for practitioners to gain access to a college degree through lifelong learning and workplace skills. The ACA Program has been determined to be equivalent to 15 semester hours of upper level baccalaureate credit by the ACE College Credit Recommendation Service. ACE will only evaluate courses of study that are comparable to the learning offered at the college level in terms of course content, learning methods, and assessment procedures. Over 1800 academic institutions accept the ACE credit recommendations. In the field of hearing instrument sciences, Spokane Falls Community College has provided advanced standing for ACA graduates, have accepted all ACA credits, and have granted an automatic one-third fulfillment toward the requirements for the two-year associate degree in hearing instrument sciences.

The ACA Program embraces the concept that working adults should have access to academic credit for formal courses and examinations taken outside traditional degree programs with 100% relevance to their chosen careers. Institutions of higher learning embrace these non-traditional approaches because they facilitate adult learners in earning undergraduate degrees. The ACA Program has been embraced by hearing instrument specialists because it provides an opportunity for them to achieve an advanced practice status, and a few have gone on to use this experience for college credit.

== Course of Study ==
The ACA educational program contains five courses structured to conform to a semester-hour format common to universities. Each of the five courses is held over three two-day sessions (weekends) for a total of 42 classroom hours per course. The core faculty consists of individuals with extensive knowledge and experience in the academic and/or business world. It is the core faculty's responsibility to teach the courses in the ACA program, evaluate student performance and attainment of learning objectives, make suggestions about additional faculty, periodically review curriculum, and make recommendations for curriculum revisions in light of new knowledge, methodologies, and advancements in hearing aid engineering.

Students are required to attend all classes and complete all class assignments with a grade of 70% or better. Failure requires that the course be repeated. Official transcripts are available to each student who completes the ACA through the ACE Transcript Services in Washington, DC.

== See also ==
- Hearing aid
- History of hearing aids
