= Dörfler =

Dörfler is a surname. Notable people with the name include:

- Emese Dörfler-Antal (born 1971), Austrian speed skater
- Fabian Dörfler (born 1983), German slalom canoeist
- Ferdinand Dörfler (1903–1965), German screenwriter and film director
- Gerhard Dörfler (born 1955), Austrian politician
- Wolfgang Kreissl-Dörfler (born 1950), German politician and Member of the European Parliament

== See also ==
- Doerfler
