= Merle Lawrence =

- Born: Merle Lawrence; December 26, 1915; Remsen, New York, U.S.
- Died: January 29, 2007; Michigan, U.S.
- Education: Princeton University (MD)
- Spouse: Roberta Harper (m. 1942)
- Children: 3
- Scientific career
- Fields: Otolaryngology
- Workplaces: Princeton University; Johns Hopkins University; School of Aviation Medicine; Bureau of Medicine and Surgery; Lempert Institute of Otology; University of Michigan; Kresge Hearing Research Institute

Merle Lawrence (December 26, 1915 – January 29, 2007) was an American physiologist who contributed extensively to the field of otolaryngology.

== Biography ==
Born in Remsen, New York, Lawrence was the son of the Reverend George W. Lawrence, DD, and Alice Bowne Lawrence. He married Roberta Harper in 1942 and they went on to have three children.

He received his PhD in 1941 at Princeton University under the supervision of Dr. E. Glen Wever, where the work on vertebrate hearing by Dr. Wever inspired Dr Lawrence to undertake the research as a lifelong study. The National Research Council offered him a fellowship that led to a postdoctoral post with Dr. Stacy Guild at the Otolaryngology Department at Johns Hopkins University.

Lawrence served as a Naval aviator of the US Naval reserve during World War II and was deployed to the South Pacific. He contributed to assignments at the School of Aviation Medicine in Pensacola, Florida, and at the Bureau of Medicine and Surgery in Washington, D.C. He held a brief position as a trainer of helicopter piloting during the Korean War.

In 1946, Lawrence became an assistant professor at Princeton University and collaborated with Dr Wever in research. He was appointed as an associate researcher at the Lempert Institute of Otology in New York City from 1946 to 1952.

Lawrence joined the Otolaryngology Department at the University of Michigan in 1952, invited by Dr. Furstenberg, chair of the Otolaryngology Department and dean of the medical school. He founded the Kresge Hearing Research Institute in 1963. Under his leadership the institute became one of the largest and most influential centers for research on hearing worldwide. As its first director until retirement in 1983, Lawrence conducted research on inner-ear physiology.

== Awards ==
He was awarded the Purple Heart and other medals for his navy service.

His work was also recognised by the American Academy of Ophthalmology and Otolaryngology, the Association for Research in Otolaryngology, the American Otological Society and the American Academy of Audiology.

== Publications ==
- "The Effect of Overstimulation and Internal Factors on the Function of the Inner Ear" (1966)
- "Sensory Perspectives" (Basic Concepts in Psychology Series) (1967)
