= International Hearing Society =

Healthcare industry body

The International Hearing Society, previously known as The National Hearing Aid Society, is a professional membership organization established in 1951 that represents hearing healthcare providers, and is a member of the World Hearing Forum. Based in Farmington Hills, Michigan, IHS represents hearing aid professionals and provides services worldwide, assisting consumers in locating qualified hearing aid specialists to conduct comprehensive hearing evaluations, recommend, order the use of, and select and fit hearing aids and related devices, and provide counseling and repairs. IHS also set standards and conducts educational programs and advocacy for the profession. IHS sponsors advanced education courses, on topics of tinnitus and advanced practices and previously conducted a course in audioprosthology. It also operates a national "Hearing Aid Helpline" that provides informational resources on hearing loss and helps locate hearing aid specialists.
