= Sandra Gordon-Salant =

American audiologist

Sandra Gordon-Salant is an American audiologist. She is a professor at the University of Maryland, College Park, where she is also director of the doctoral program in clinical audiology. Gordon-Salant investigates the effects of aging and hearing loss on auditory processes, as well as signal enhancement devices for hearing-impaired listeners. She is the senior editor of the 2010 book, The Aging Auditory System. Gordon-Salant has served as editor of the Journal of Speech, Language, and Hearing Research.

== Biography ==
Gordon-Salant earned her B.S. in Speech Pathology at University at Albany, State University of New York in 1974. She attended graduate school at Northwestern University, where she received her Masters of Arts in Audiology in 1976. In 1977, she was awarded her membership from and Certificate of Clinical Competence in Audiology from the American Speech and Hearing Association. Gordon-Salant completed her Ph.D. in Audiology at Northwestern University in 1981.

In 1981, she joined the faculty of the Hearing and Speech Sciences Department in University of Maryland, College Park, moving from Assistant to Associate to Full Faculty at the institution. She has been a faculty member of the Neuroscience and Cognitive Science program at the University of Maryland since 1992 as well as a faculty member of the Language Science Center since 2015. She has served as Director of the Doctoral Program in Audiology at UMD since 2002.

Gordon-Salant conducts research on the effects of aging and hearing loss on auditory processes. Over the course of her career, she has published over 90 articles and book chapters. She is the senior editor of the 2010 book, The Aging Auditory System. Gordon-Salant has served as editor of the Journal of Speech, Language, and Hearing Research.

== Awards and honors ==
In 2009, Gordon-Salant was awarded the James F. Jerger Award for Outstanding Career in Research from the American Academy of Audiology. In 2010, she was elected as a Fellow of the Acoustical Society of America. The American Speech-Language-Hearing Association awarded her the Al Kawana Award for outstanding contributions to research in 2013, and in 2017 she received the Honors of the Association.

In 2017, Gordon-Salant was named a Distinguished Scholar-Teacher by the University of Maryland.

== Selected publications ==
=== Book ===
- Gordon-Salant, Sandra; Frisina, Arthur; Fay, Richard; Popper, eds. (2010). The Aging Auditory System. New York: Springer. ISBN 9781441909947.

=== Articles ===
- Gordon-Salant, Sandra; Fitzgibbons, Peter J. (1993). "Temporal Factors and Speech Recognition Performance in Young and Elderly Listeners". Journal of Speech, Language, and Hearing Research. 36 (6): 1276–1285. doi:10.1044/jshr.3606.1276. PMID 8114494.
- Pearson, Jay D.; Morrell, Christopher H.; Gordon-Salant, Sandra; Brant, Larry J.; Metter, E. Jeffrey; Klein, Lisa L.; Fozard, James L. (1995). "Gender differences in a longitudinal study of age-associated hearing loss". The Journal of the Acoustical Society of America. 97 (2): 1196–1205. Bibcode:1995ASAJ...97.1196P. doi:10.1121/1.412231. PMID 7876442.
- Gordon-Salant, Sandra; Fitzgibbons, Peter J. (1997). "Selected Cognitive Factors and Speech Recognition Performance Among Young and Elderly Listeners". Journal of Speech, Language, and Hearing Research. 40 (2): 423–431. doi:10.1044/jslhr.4002.423. PMID 9130210.
- Gordon-Salant, Sandra; Fitzgibbons, Peter J. (1999). "Profile of Auditory Temporal Processing in Older Listeners". Journal of Speech, Language, and Hearing Research. 42 (2): 300–311. doi:10.1044/jslhr.4202.300. PMID 10229448.
- Gordon-Salant, Sandra (2005). "Hearing loss and aging: New research findings and clinical implications". The Journal of Rehabilitation Research and Development. 42 (4s): 9–24. doi:10.1682/JRRD.2005.01.0006. PMID 16470462.
- Lin, F. R.; Thorpe, R.; Gordon-Salant, S.; Ferrucci, L. (2011). "Hearing Loss Prevalence and Risk Factors Among Older Adults in the United States". The Journals of Gerontology Series A: Biological Sciences and Medical Sciences. 66A (5): 582–590. doi:10.1093/gerona/glr002. ISSN 1079-5006. PMC 3074958. PMID 21357188.
