= Lyric Hearing =

Hearing aid device

Lyric Hearing is an extended wear hearing aid developed by InSound Medical, founded by medical device inventor entrepreneur Adnan Shennib and Thar Casey. The device rests inside the ear canal and uses the ears anatomy to funnel sound to the ear drum. The device is placed into the ear canal by a certified professional and no surgery or anesthesia is required when inserting the device. Although individual replacement needs can vary, Lyric is designed to be worn for up to 4 months at a time without needing to remove it or replace batteries.

The design and placement of the Lyric Hearing device reduces background noise and feedback for natural sound quality. Wearers of the device can use it while talking on the phone, exercising, or sleeping and do not need to fear the device falling out. Lyric Hearing is also water resistant, so wearers can shower with the device or do other water surface based activities, although the company does not recommend swimming or diving.

The Lyric Hearing device is not a Cochlear Implant. The device is removed every few months and is replaced with a new one. Wearers can adjust the volume of the device using a magnet and a removal tool is also provided. Business Week reports that this hearing aid received a 2009 Medical Design Excellence Award.

Lyric was sold in 2010 to Sonova, the parent company of Phonak, a hearing aid (daily wear) manufacturer. Phonak launched a new version of the Lyric (Lyric 2) in 2012 that is smaller in order to fit more ear canals.
