= Pierre de Villiers Pienaar =

South African academic (1904–1978)

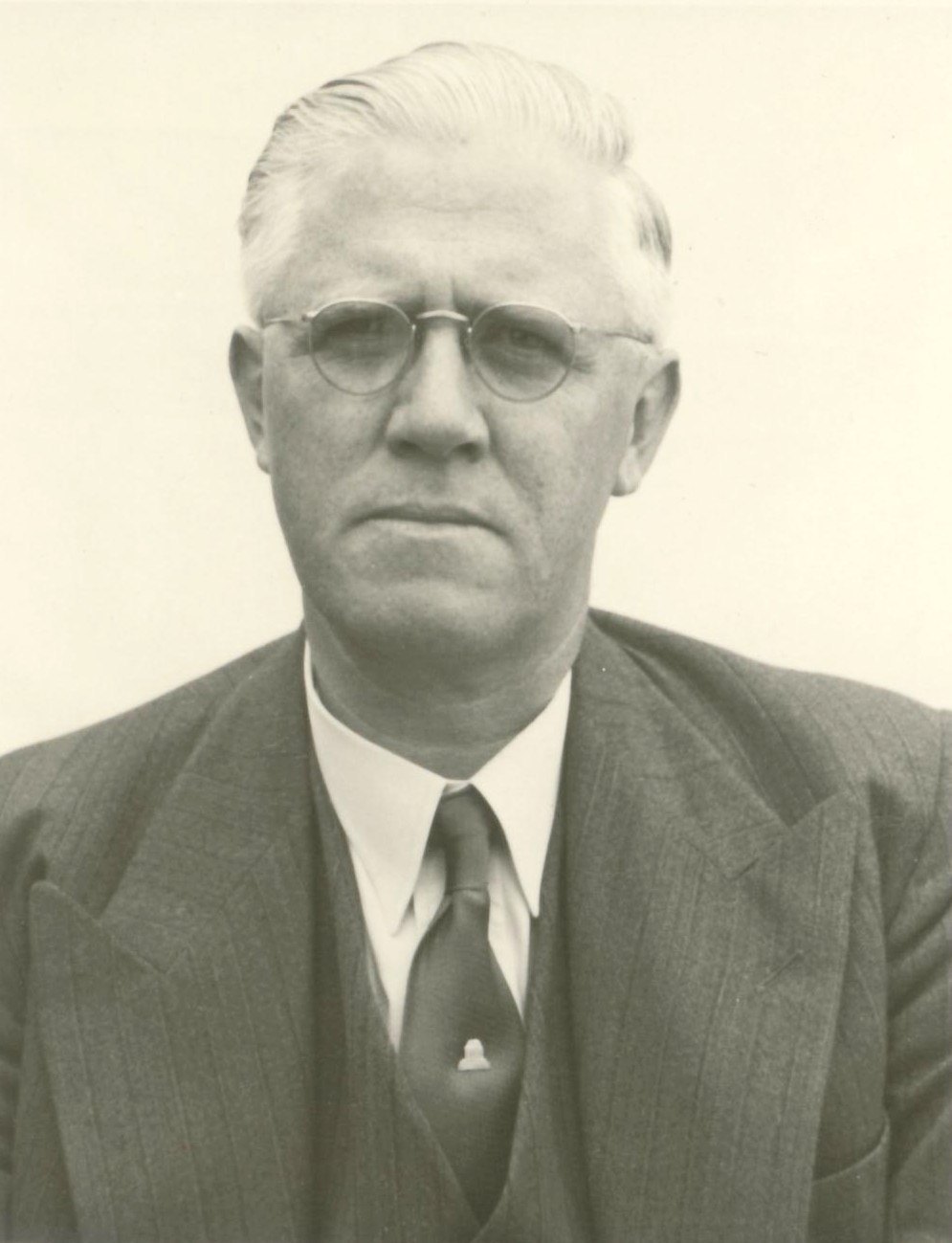
Pierre de Villiers Pienaar – date unknown

Pierre de Villiers Pienaar (1904–1978) was a South African Afrikaans academic and Professor at University of the Witwatersrand (Wits) and later at University of Pretoria, who pioneered speech language therapy in South Africa and specialising in audiology and lexicography as well as being an Afrikaans author. As lexicographer in 1973, he was part of the group of authors that established the Afrikaans Explanatory Dictionary (Afrikaans Verklarende Woordeboek) alongside Prof M.S.B. Kritzinger and Prof F.J. Labuschagne.

== Biography ==
=== Early life and education ===
Pierre de Villiers Pienaar was born on 11 August 1904 on the farm Elandsfontein, Gatsrand (currently in the Fochville district), that was destroyed in The Anglo-Boer War during the scorched earth policy campaign. He attended the primary farm school on Elandsfontein, and then went to Boy's High, Potchefstroom, where he matriculated in the first class in 1921. In 1922 he entered the university of the Witwatersrand and the Johannesburg Teachers Training College. He received the B.A. degree in education the beginning of 1925, and later that year the Honours B.A. degree in the first class. In 1926 the University of the Witwatersrand awarded him the degree Master of Arts with distinction for his research in phonetics and general linguistics. The following year Pienaar was awarded a union bursary to further his studies in Utrecht, Netherlands (September 1927 – April 1928), and Hamburg, Germany (1928–1929), where he continued his research in general linguistics and the phonetics of Afrikaans at the Department of Experimental Phonetics of the University of Hamburg. Here, under the leadership of Prof. G. Panconcelli-Calzia, he was awarded the PhD degree in 1929.

The Elandsfontein farm was where renowned Boer War scout, Danie Theron, was temporarily buried after his death in combat in the Fochville area during September 1900. (Theron was reburied in 1903 to the family cemetery of his late fiancée Hannie Neethling, on her father's farm Eikenhof.)

=== Academic career ===
Pienaar taught at several schools on the Witwatersrand and Nylstroom (1926–1927 and on his return to South Africa, 1930–1932). In 1933 he was appointed lecturer in the Department of African Languages, University of the Witwatersrand, Johannesburg, under the headship of Prof. C.M. Doke. He was promoted to senior lecturer in Phonetics and Logopedics in 1938, and through his efforts the first diploma course in Logopedics in South Africa was instituted soon after he had established the Speech, Voice and Hearing Clinic at this university. He developed this section of the Department of African Languages to such an extent that, in 1944, it became the separate Department of Phonetics, Linguistics and Logopedics with Pienaar as head and also director of the associated Speech, Voice and Hearing Clinic. Through his efforts the University of the Witwatersrand in 1948, instituted a four-year degree course with Phonetics and Logopedics as major subjects, the first of its kind in South Africa. He remained head of this department till the end of 1956. In 1957 he joined the University of South Africa for two years as Professor of Afrikaans and Netherlands Linguistics. During this time he put forward proposals to create a professional degree course in Logopedics at the university of Pretoria.

In 1959 Pienaar was appointed professor and head of the new Department of Speech Science, Logopedics and Audiology at the University of Pretoria. This department also incorporated a speech, voice and hearing clinic, of which he was the Director. He chaired this department and remained Director of the clinic till the end of 1969 when he reached retirement age. To benefit from his vast experience, the University of Pretoria continued to retain his services by appointing him as temporary lecturer in 1970. He held this appointment as Professor Emeritus in the department for two years, and became honorary professor for the period 1973–1974. In 1973 he opened a private consulting room in Pretoria for the rehabilitation of persons with voice disorders. In his retirement he was still engaged in the field of Afrikaans phonetics. He was appointed head of the speech archives sponsored by the Department of National Education and the Human Sciences Research Council. Among his students who majored in phonetics, three have become heads of university departments of Phonetics or African Languages in South Africa (L. W. Langham, D. T. Cole, and E. O. J. Westphall).

During his tenure at the universities he persuaded the Departments of Education of all the South African provinces to appoint speech therapists and audiologists in schools, hospitals and other institutions, thus improving the speech and hearing of thousands of people. His diagnostic acumen and therapeutic skill with voice disordered cases have earned the respect of several ear, nose and throat specialists who increasingly referred cases of this nature to him and the speech therapists that he had trained.

Pienaar was a member of several scientific societies and served on a number of commissions, committees and councils of the Government and other institutions such as the South African Broadcasting Corporation (SABC), the Department of Education, the Film Council, the Department of Health, the South African Academy of Arts and Science, the Transoranje Institute for Special Education, the South African Council for the Deaf, and others. Noteworthy, he served on the Language Advisory Committee of the SABC (1957–1968); the Advisory Committee for Language Laboratories of the Government Department of Education, Arts and Science; the Film Board of the Republic of South Africa since its inception; the Board of the Transoranje Institute for Special Education as representative of the Department of National Education; the editorial board of Folia Phoniatrica, the journal published by the International Logopedic and Phoniatric Society; the Commission appointed by the Department of Health to investigate the use and abuse of hearing aids in South Africa; clinical and technical committees of the South African Council for the Deaf, the Transoranje School for Partially Hearing Children, the National Committee for Noise Control in South Africa, and the South African Speech and Hearing Association. He advised several national and international universities on the training of therapists in the field of communication pathology. Others asked his advice on setting up language laboratories.

=== Membership and awards ===
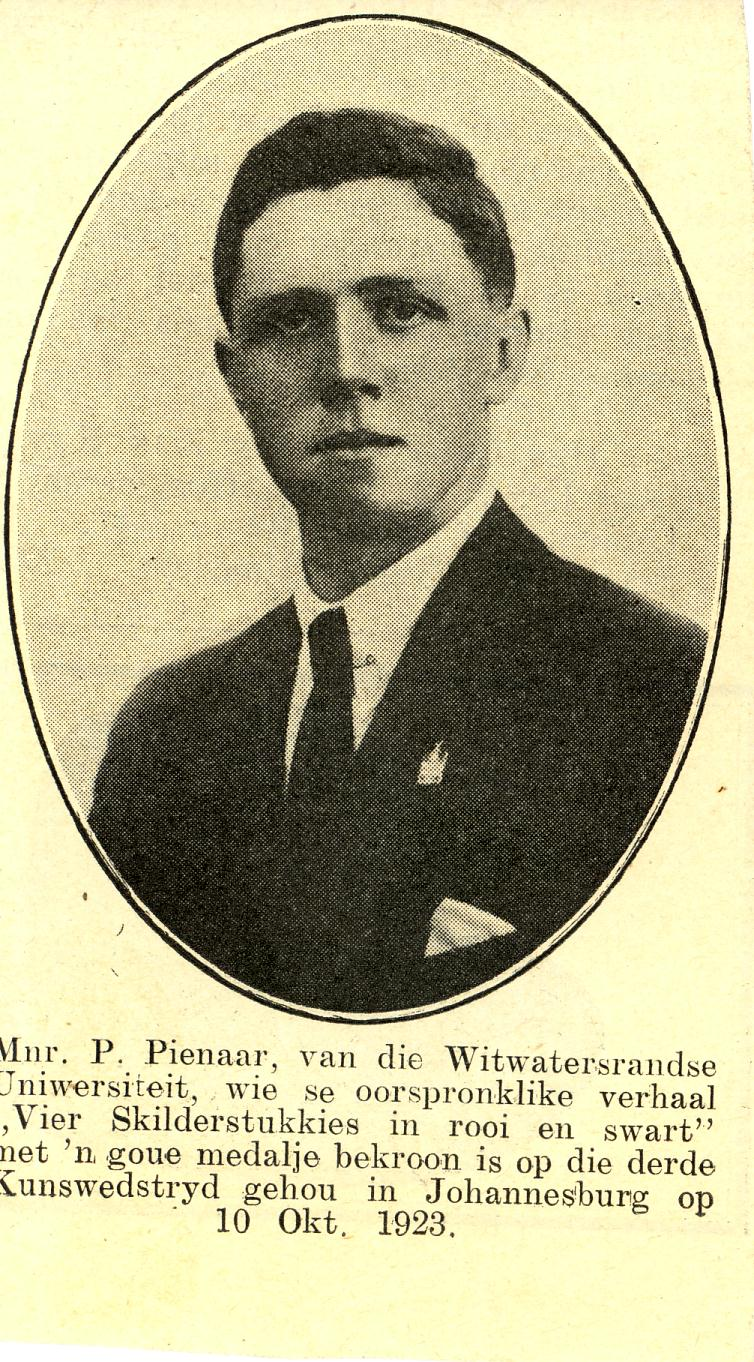
News paper photo with inscription that reads 'Mr P Pienaar, from the University of the Witwatersrand, whose original story of "Four little paintings in red and black" was crowned with a gold medal at the third Literature (Art) competition held in Johannesburg, 10 October 1923'.

The union bursary that he received in 1927 was one of many grants and awards. In 1952 he received the Carnegie Fellowship that enabled him to spend an extensive period researching speech archives, and various logopedics and audiology centres in Europe, the United Kingdom and the United States of America. On his return he incorporated many new facets in the academic and clinical fields. During 1962, and again in 1965, he received grants from the Transoranje Institute and the National Council for the Deaf to attend international conferences dealing with logopedics and audiology. At this time he was appointed Honorary Life President of the South African Logopedic Society. In 1963 the Suid-Afrikaanse Akademie vir Wetenskap en Kuns awarded him their Erepenning for his work in the field of Afrikaans phonetics. The Journal of the South African Speech and Hearing Association published a special issue in honour of Pienaar in 1974. In 2004 the two departments that he established at the University of the Witwatersrand and the University of Pretoria, commemorated his centenary anniversary and honoured him as the doyen of the profession of Communication Pathology, as his field of expertise is presently known and practised in South Africa.

=== Afrikaans culture ===
As the son of Matthys Michiel Pienaar, a Boer who fought the British imperialist armies in both the first and second Anglo-Boer war, Pienaar was a staunch supporter of the political ideology of former Prime Minister, General J. M. B. Hertzog and Adv. N. C. Havenga. He championed the Afrikaner cause (that was in desperate need after the scorched earth policy of the British army during the second Anglo-Boer war) by being a founding member of the Handhawersbond (Upholding Association) and was the first editor of their journal, Die Handhawer. He served on the Reddingsdaadbond, another association to uplift the destitute Afrikaner people. He was member of many cultural and arts societies such as the Skrywerskring (Writers Association). He served on the school committee that founded the Jan Celliers Primary School, the first Afrikaans primary school in the northern suburbs of Johannesburg. In the early 1940s he persuaded his friend, Prof. C. M. van den Heever (a famous writer and head of the Department of Afrikaans and Netherlands at the University of the Witwatersrand who had recently published a biography on General Hertzog) to serve as co-editor of the Kultuurgeskiedenis van die Afrikaner (Cultural History of the Afrikaner). They published this monumental work in three volumes from 1945 to 1950. His other cultural works are Opera en Sanger (1951); and as sole editor, an abridged (single volume) and revised edition of the Kultuurgeskiedenis van die Afrikaner (1968).

=== Academic and literary work ===
His academic works not only included works on phonetics and communication pathology, but also lexicological work: Afrikaanse Fonetiek (Afrikaans Phonetics) (1927, with T. H. le Roux); Die Fonoposotie in die Fonotopie van Afrikaanse afsluitings en vernouingsklanke binne die spraakmolekuul (1930); Praat u Beskaaf (1939) (Do you speak polite); Die Afrikaanse Spreektaal (The Afrikaans spoken language) (1947); Uitspraakwoordeboek van Afrikaans (1945– 4th Ed. 1963); An Afrikaans-English Phonetic Reader (1948, with A. G. Hooper); chapter entitled: 'Speech Disorganization', in Social Medicine (1951, edited by E. H. Cluver); chapter entitled: 'Speech Pathology in South Africa', in Speech Pathology (1966, eds. R. W. Rieber and R. S. Brubaker); Afrikaanse Verklarende Woordeboek (1973) (Afrikaans Explanatory Dictionary), with M. S. B. Kritzinger and F. J. Labuschagne).

During the period 1929–1940 he wrote a number of literary works: Skakels van die Ketting (Links of a chain) (1928); Ruth e.a. Kortverhale (1934); Magte (Powers) (1936); Die Oorlogskind e.a. Kortverhale (The war child, short stories) (1940).

He loved the theatre, classical music events, and opera. In his younger days he took singing lessons from an Italian maestro. He played tennis and attended many rugby matches. He was fond of sketching, gardening, carpentry, and writing poetry and short stories. He had a large library and would discuss the books with his circle of literary friends. Above all he loved the tranquility of the Kruger National Park; and was indeed an honorary game ranger. As patriarch of the extensive Pienaar family he often had to solve their problems. On these occasions he relaxed on the family farm Elandsfontein by walking in the veld and enjoying the bird life.

=== Marriage, family and children ===
He married Frederika Vermaak on 31 January 1928 in Greytown, Natal. They had three children: Rousselot De Villiers Pienaar (professor and head of the Department of Genetics, University of Stellenbosch), Uys De Villiers Pienaar (head of the Kruger National Park 1970–1987, then Chief Director of National Parks until 1991 when he retired), and Anne Lize Mordant (née De Villiers Pienaar, veterinary surgeon), who is married to David Mordant, retired CEO of a grain import–export company in South Africa.

In August 1977 Pierre de Villiers Pienaar suffered a massive stroke that left him paralysed and with no speech. He died in the Kronendal Nursinghome, Pretoria, on 6 April 1978. He was cremated and his ashes scattered on his beloved family farm, Elandsfontein.

== External references ==
1. Aron, Myrtle L. (1973): Pierre de Villiers Pienaar. J. South African Speech and Hearing Association. Vol.20 (1):7–13. Special Issue in Honour of Pierre de Villiers Pienaar.

2. Bauman, S. (1961): Milestone in Logopedics. Convocation Commentary 3: 23–27.

3. Die Burger, 7 April 1978, page 5: Prof. Pienaar na siekbed oorlede. (Prof. Pienaar died in sickbed -Afrikaans newspaper article)

4. Hoofstad, 21 October 1969, page 4: 'n Professor vereer met skildery. (A professor honoured with portrait painting – Afrikaans newspaper article)

5. Hoofstad, 7 April 1978, page 3: Spraakwetenskap se baanbreker oorlede. (Speech science pioneer deceased – Afrikaans newspaper article)

6. Pienaar, R.D.V. (1986): Biografie van Pierre de Villiers Pienaar. Article written for the South African Biographical Dictionary

7. The Curriculum Vitae of Pierre de Villiers Pienaar.

8. Tukkie-Werf, Vol.4(4), May 1978 page 8: In Memorium (University of Pretoria circular)

9. University of Pretoria Annual Report 2004: Centenary Anniversary of P De V Pienaar. Pages 2–3.

10. Pienaar, P. Hooper, AG. (1948): An Afrikaans-English Phonetic Reader, Publisher Witwatersrand University Press
