= Patriki =

Patriki: Πατρίκι (Greek); Tuzluca (Turkish)
- Village
- Location in Cyprus
- Coordinates: 35°21′47″N 33°59′46″E
- Country (de jure): Cyprus
  - District: Famagusta District
- Country (de facto): Northern Cyprus
  - District: İskele District
- Time zone: UTC+2 (EET)
  - Summer (DST): UTC+3 (EEST)

Patriki (Greek: Πατρίκι; Turkish: Tuzluca) is a village in the Famagusta District of Cyprus, located on the Karpas Peninsula. It is under the de facto control of Northern Cyprus.

== History ==
The village has been under Turkish occupation since the 1974 Turkish invasion of Cyprus. The village used to be inhabited by Greek Cypriots. In his book Historic Cyprus (second edition 1947) Rupert Gunnis (who was Inspector of Antiquities on the island at the time) wrote:

The principal church of the village dedicated to the Archangel Michael is without interest. Near by lies a small Chapel of St. George, with a few fragments of early woodwork built into the miserable iconostasis, which is otherwise formed of boards from packing-cases. The poor and late seventeenth-century holy doors from some destroyed church are kept in a coffee-shop. One of the most curious local customs still remaining in the island is practised every Easter Monday in this village; all the married persons gather into the churchyard, and the men, without taking off their coats, have to crawl through a hole in a large stone which stands here. If the man is unable to crawl through this stone it means that his wife is unfaithful to him, for it shows that he has antlers which prevent him from passing through. In 1935 only one man stuck, and he, on his return home, beat his wife and has since started divorce proceedings, the fact that he was unable to pass through the stone being considered by him and his co-villagers as ample evidence.

Pre-1974, the main church used by the Greek Orthodox villagers was Archangelos Michail, however it was desecrated by the Turkish Army post-1974 and has been used as a mosque since. The smaller church of Agios Georgios is in a deteriorating condition, having been desecrated and repurposed for storing fertilizer for agriculture. The village is also home to two chapels, Agios Prodromos and Panagia Trypimeni, both of which suffer from desecration and neglect as a result of the Turkish occupation.

== In popular culture ==
Patriki is the home village of Kyriacos Panayiotou, the father of English singer George Michael.

== Notable people ==
- Philipos C. Loizou (1965–2012), university professor
