= Susan Shore =

American audiologist

Susan Ellen Shore
- Born: Johannesburg, South Africa
- Education: University of the Witwatersrand (BS, MA); Louisiana State University (PhD)
- Scientific career
- Workplaces: University of Michigan; Kresge Hearing Research Institute; University of Pittsburgh
- Thesis: Cochlear partition responses to frequency-varying signals. (1976)

Susan Ellen Shore is an American audiologist who is the Merle Lawrence Collegiate Professor of Otolaryngology at the University of Michigan. She was elected Fellow of the American Association for the Advancement of Science in 2021.

== Early life and education ==
Shore was born in Johannesburg, South Africa, and pursued her bachelor's and master's degrees at the University of the Witwatersrand. She first specialized in pathology and audiology before starting a master's in hearing science. Her research considers dichotic listening. After completing her master's, she joined the Kresge Hearing Research Institute at Louisiana State University. Her doctoral research involved studying how the cochlea responds to frequency-varying signals. After earning her doctorate, Shore joined the University of Pittsburgh as research fellow.

== Research and career ==
In 2005, Shore joined Michigan Medicine, where she started a research group investigating auditory processing. She was particularly interested in the contributions of multisensory systems. Shore identified that certain neurons, which receive input from the face and head, were sensitive to touch. These somatosensory neurons (fusiform cells) send signals to the cochlear nucleus and make it respond to sound. She showed that the somatosensory neurons interact with the nucleus even more acutely after deafness, likely to compensate for the conventional cochlea input. The increase in somatosensory excitations (activity in the fusiform cells) can result in the development of tinnitus, a condition that impacts around 15% of Americans. As Chair of the Scientific Advisory Committee of the American Tinnitus Association, Shore testified before the United States House of Representatives in support of the Tinnitus Research and Treatment Act in 2013.

Shore has investigated synaptic plasticity and the longitudinal nature of these neural changes. She proposed a precise pattern of simulations that can be used to reverse this process. This strategy, targeted bimodal auditory-somatosensory stimulation, which involved a series of sounds coupled with precisely timed electrical pulses. This combination can launch a process called stimulus-timing dependent plasticity. Specifically, the Auricle (or Michigan Tinnitus Device) looks to reprogram the fusiform cells of the dorsal cochlear nucleus.

Shore was named the Merle Lawrence Collegiate Professor of Otolaryngology Research at the University of Michigan in 2021.

== Awards and honors ==
- 2003 Lydia Adams de Witt Award for Women in Science and Engineering
- 2017 National Institutes of Health Award
- 2019 STAT Madness
- 2021 Elected Fellow of the American Association for the Advancement of Science

== Selected publications ==
- Gerilyn R. Jones, David T. Martel, Travis L. Riffle, Josh Errickson, Jacqueline R. Souter, Gregory J. Basura, Emily Stucken, Kara C. Schvartz-Leyzac, Susan E. Shore (June 2023). "Reversing synchronized brain circuits using targeted auditory-somatosensory stimulation to treat phantom percepts: a randomized clinical trial" JAMA Network Open, 2023; 6 (6): e2315914 DOI: http://dx.doi.org/10.1001/jamanetworkopen.2023.15914
- Larry E Roberts; Jos J Eggermont; Donald M Caspary; Susan E Shore; Jennifer R Melcher; James A Kaltenbach (1 November 2010). "Ringing ears: the neuroscience of tinnitus". The Journal of Neuroscience. 30 (45): 14972–14979. doi:10.1523/jneurosci.4028-10.2010. ISSN 0270-6474. PMC 3073522. PMID 21068300. Wikidata Q30475535.
- Susan E. Shore; Larry E. Roberts; Berthold Langguth (12 February 2016). "Maladaptive plasticity in tinnitus--triggers, mechanisms and treatment". Nature Reviews Neurology. 12 (3): 150–160. doi:10.1038/nrneurol.2016.12. ISSN 1759-4758. PMC 4895692. PMID 26868680. Wikidata Q26766583.
- S E Shore; Z Vass; N L Wys; R A Altschuler (1 April 2000). "Trigeminal ganglion innervates the auditory brainstem". The Journal of Comparative Neurology. 419 (3): 271–285. doi:10.1002/(sici)1096-9861(20000410)419:3<271::aid-cne1>3.0.co;2-m. ISSN 0021-9967. PMID 10723004. Wikidata Q50497302.
