= Bolajoko Olubukunola Olusanya =

Nigerian paediatrician

- Awards: Aram Glorig Award by the International Society of Audiology in 2018
- Scientific career
- Fields: Paediatrics

Bolajoko Olubukunola Olusanya is a Nigerian paediatrician. She is a specialist in audiological medicine.

== Early life ==
Olusanya has congenital mid-frequency hearing loss, but was not diagnosed until she was 33. She studied medicine at the University of Ibadan, graduating in 1982. She then trained as a paediatrician at the UCL Great Ormond Street Institute of Child Health and the Donald Winnicott Centre, both in London. After she completed her training in Nigeria, she faced a choice between either following a purely academic career or becoming a social entrepreneur, deciding to take the latter path.

== Career ==
Olusanya launched Hearing International Nigeria (HING) in 1999. She later formed the Nigerian Dyslexia Association and then combined it with HING into the Centre for Healthy Start Initiative in 2011. Between 2003 and 2007, she went back to University College London to work on a PhD in paediatrics and audiological medicine. Her PhD, awarded in 2008, was entitled "Infant hearing screening models for the early detection of permanent childhood hearing loss in Nigeria". As of 2020, Olusanya had published over 200 articles in academic journals. In 2019, she joined the Lancet Commission for Global Hearing Loss, a World Health Organization (WHO) initiative to treat deafness globally. According to Olusanya, the main causes of hearing loss in Nigeria were electricity generators, prescription antibiotics and the continual presence of noise.

Olusanya is a director of Global Research on Developmental Disabilities Collaborators (GRDDC), a group of paediatric experts funded by the Bill and Melinda Gates Foundation and the Institute for Health Metrics and Evaluation. In 2018, it published research in The Lancet demonstrating that in Nigeria there were 2.5 million children with developmental disabilities in 2016, as opposed to 1.5 million in 1990. Developmental disabilities are defined as health conditions which affect children long-term, such as autism spectrum disorder, attention deficit hyperactivity disorder, cerebral palsy, Down syndrome and hearing loss.

== Accolades ==
Olusanya was awarded the Aram Glorig Award by the International Society of Audiology in 2018.

== Selected works ==
- Olusanya, Bolajoko; Eletu, Olaseinde; Odusote, Olatunde; Somefun, Abayomi; Olude, Olufemi (October 2006). "Early detection of infant hearing loss: Current experiences of health professionals in a developing country". Acta Paediatrica. 95 (10): 1300–1302. doi:10.1080/08035250600603016. PMID 16982506. S2CID 25978633.
- Olusanya, Bolajoko O.; Afe, Abayomi J.; Onyia, Ngozi O. (August 2009). "Infants with HIV-infected mothers in a universal newborn hearing screening programme in Lagos, Nigeria". Acta Paediatrica. 98 (8): 1288–1293. doi:10.1111/j.1651-2227.2009.01337.x. PMID 19519758. S2CID 39310671.
- Olusanya, Bolajoko O. (July 2012). "Neonatal hearing screening and intervention in resource-limited settings: an overview". Archives of Disease in Childhood. 97 (7): 654–659. doi:10.1136/archdischild-2012-301786. PMID 22611062. S2CID 15564631.
- Olusanya, Bolajoko O.; Davis, Adrian C.; Kassebaum, Nicholas J. (February 2019). "Poor data produce poor models: children with developmental disabilities deserve better – Authors' reply". The Lancet Global Health. 7 (2): e189. doi:10.1016/S2214-109X(18)30496-0. PMID 30683237.
