= Speech banana =

Audiogram feature

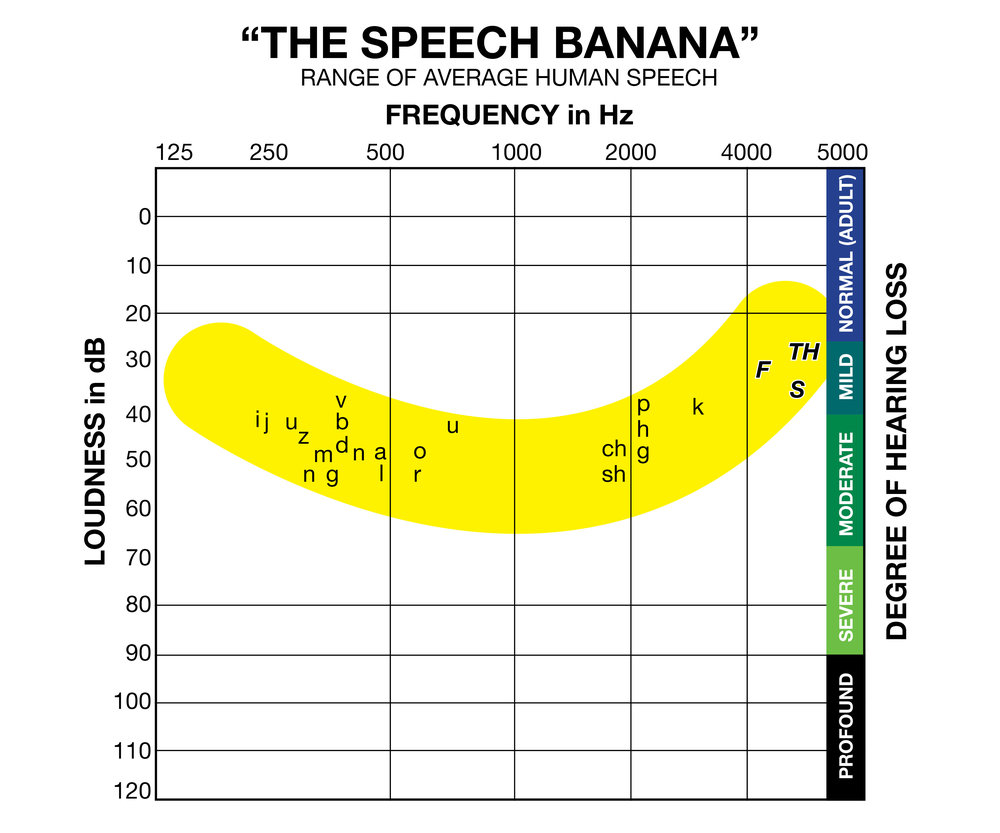
Speech Banana

The speech banana is a banana-shaped region where the sounds (phonemes) of human languages appear on an audiogram. (An audiogram is a graphical representation of someone's ability to hear over a range of frequencies and loudness levels. Hearing on an audiogram is displayed as frequency in Hertz on the x-axis and loudness in decibels on the y-axis.)

Audiologists are primarily concerned with hearing loss that occurs within the speech banana because:

- In children, it can slow the development of speech and comprehension, and that in turn can profoundly interfere with learning.
- In adults, it can hinder communication, which can cause social isolation and may be a risk factor for dementia. Hearing loss is most common in older adults (presbycusis).

People with normal hearing can also hear sounds outside of the speech banana, including both lower-pitched sounds (such bass musical notes and rumbling noises) and higher-pitched sounds (such as very high musical notes, the rustling of leaves, and the chirping of birds).

== Bibliography ==
- Lin, Frank R.; Metter, E. Jeffrey; O’Brien, Richard J.; Resnick, Susan M.; Zonderman, Alan B.; Ferrucci, Luigi (February 2011). "Hearing Loss and Incident Dementia". Archives of Neurology. 68 (2): 214–220. doi:10.1001/archneurol.2010.362. PMC 3277836. PMID 21320988.
