= Sharon Kujawa =

Clinical audiologist

- Citizenship: American
- Occupations: Director of Audiology Research, Massachusetts Eye and Ear
- Awards: Callier Prize 2017; Distinguished Achievement Award, American Academy of Audiology 2010

Academic background
- Education: Michigan State University (BS); Idaho State University (MS); University of Arizona (PhD)

Academic work
- Institutions: Harvard Medical School

Sharon G. Kujawa is a clinical audiologist, Director of Audiology Research at the Massachusetts Eye and Ear Infirmary, Associate Professor of Otology and Laryngology at Harvard Medical School, and Adjunct Faculty of Harvard-MIT Health Sciences and Technology.and specialist in otolaryngology, Her specialty is the effects of noise exposure and aging on auditory function.

== Biography ==
Kujawa completed a BS from Michigan State University, a MS from Idaho State University, and a PhD from the University of Arizona in 1993. She completed two post-doctoral fellowships, the first in auditory pharmacology at Kresge Institute of Louisiana State University Medical Center, and the second in auditory neurophysiology in the Eaton-Peabody Laboratory at Harvard University. She was director of audiology at the University of Washington before joining the faculty of Harvard Medical School.

Kujawa has served on the executive board of the American Academy of Audiology and as chair of their research committee. She has also served on the board of directors of the American Auditory Society and as an editorial board member and section editor of the journal Ear and Hearing. She has served as a member of the Scientific Review Council for the Deafness Research Foundation and on the working group on translational research for the National Institute on Deafness and other Communication Disorders.

== Research ==
Kujawa's research program aims to find out aging and noise exposure alter inner ear structures and functions, how genetic factors affect vulnerability to hearing loss, and how neural processes can be manipulated for purposes of treatment or prevention. Noise-induced and age-related hearing loss are the most common forms of hearing loss seen in adult patients and they often co-exist in the same patients. In collaboration with M. Charles Liberman and other researchers, Kujawa has examined the vulnerability of the synapses that connect hair cells in the cochlea to auditory nerve fibers. Their research has shown that cochlear synapses may be temporarily or permanently damaged from overexposure to intense sound.

== Honors ==
In 2017, Kujawa received the biennial Callier Prize in Communication Disorders awarded by the Callier Center for Communication Disorders at the University of Texas at Dallas, for her research on hidden sensorineural hearing loss, characterized as difficulties hearing in noisy listening environments.

In 2010, Kujawa was awarded the Distinguished Achievement Award from the American Academy of Audiology for research "exploring mechanisms related to compromise in normal auditory function from noise exposure and how noise can alter the aging of the inner ear and neural systems."

In 2003, she received the Distinguished Alumnus Award in Speech and Hearing by the University of Arizona.

== Representative Publications ==
- Furman AC, Kujawa SG, Liberman MC (August 2013). "Noise-induced cochlear neuropathy is selective for fibers with low spontaneous rates". Journal of Neurophysiology. 110 (3): 577–86. doi:10.1152/jn.00164.2013. PMC 3742994. PMID 23596328.
- Kujawa SG, Liberman MC (February 2006). "Acceleration of age-related hearing loss by early noise exposure: evidence of a misspent youth". The Journal of Neuroscience. 26 (7): 2115–23. doi:10.1523/JNEUROSCI.4985-05.2006. PMC 1855187. PMID 16481444.
- Kujawa SG, Liberman MC (November 2009). "Adding insult to injury: cochlear nerve degeneration after "temporary" noise-induced hearing loss". The Journal of Neuroscience. 29 (45): 14077–85. doi:10.1523/JNEUROSCI.2845-09.2009. PMC 2812055. PMID 19906956.
- Kujawa SG, Liberman MC (December 2015). "Synaptopathy in the noise-exposed and aging cochlea: Primary neural degeneration in acquired sensorineural hearing loss". Hearing Research. 330 (Pt B): 191–9. doi:10.1016/j.heares.2015.02.009. PMC 4567542. PMID 25769437.
- Kujawa SG, Liberman MC (March 2019). "Translating animal models to human therapeutics in noise-induced and age-related hearing loss". Hearing Research. 377: 44–52. doi:10.1016/j.heares.2019.03.003. PMC 6534965. PMID 30903954.
- Sergeyenko Y, Lall K, Liberman MC, Kujawa SG (August 2013). "Age-related cochlear synaptopathy: an early-onset contributor to auditory functional decline". The Journal of Neuroscience. 33 (34): 13686–94. doi:10.1523/JNEUROSCI.1783-13.2013. PMC 3755715. PMID 23966690.
