= Kevin Munro (audiologist) =

University of Manchester professor of audiology

- Born: Kevin James Munro; May 1963 (age 63)

Academic work
- Discipline: Audiology

Kevin James Munro (born May 1963) is Ewing Professor of Audiology and director of the Manchester Centre for Audiology and Deafness at the University of Manchester. He is a principal fellow and former chairman of the British Society of Audiology and a NIHR senior investigator, the only audiologist to be awarded that distinction.
