= Doctor of Audiology =

Professional degree for an audiologist

The Doctor of Audiology (AuD, sometimes written Au.D.) is a professional degree for an audiologist. The AuD program is designed to produce audiologists who are skilled in providing diagnostic, rehabilitative, and other services associated with hearing, balance, tinnitus management, and related audiological fields. These individuals help patients with hearing problems primarily by diagnosing hearing loss and fitting hearing assistive devices. For schools granting the degree, see granting institutions.

Within the AuD training program, there is an emphasis on the clinical learning experience, though most programs also have a research component.

The majority of AuD programs include three years of didactic and clinical instruction and a one-year externship. A few schools offer accelerated three-year programs. Programs differ in their prerequisite requirements for admission, though broadly applicants must have some background in the natural and social sciences, mathematics, and humanities. While it may be helpful for applicants to have a background in the communication sciences and disorders, this is not generally required for admission to an AuD program.

As of 2007, in the United States the AuD has replaced Masters-level audiology programs as the entry-level degree for clinical providers. Other countries, such as Australia, Canada and India, still specify the master's degree before practicing clinical audiology. In the United States, after an AuD is obtained, some states may also require a license before practicing audiology clinically.

== History ==
During the 20th century, the field of Audiology as a health care providing professional practice grew and developed internationally. Dafydd ("Dai") Stephens and others asserted, "medical treatment and the technology by itself would not form an effective treatment and recognized that psychosocial aspects play an important role in clinical practice".

In the US, the idea for the AuD creating different post-baccalaureate educational paths for research scholars (seeking MA, and later, PhD degrees) and for patient-oriented, audiology health care providers was discussed by members of originated from the 1978 American Speech-Language-Hearing Association (ASHA) Task Force on Speech, Language, and Hearing Science. A subsequent 1983 ASHA professional review affirmed the master's degree awarded at that time did not provide adequate practitioner/clinical preparation, and thus in 1984 an ASHA Task Force recommended a professional doctorate (like those held by an MD, DDS, OD, etc.) be created,

"At the 1987 ASHA convention in New Orleans, Rick Talbott had organized a panel discussion on the future of Clinical Audiology. The panel members were James Jerger, James Hall, George Osborne, Lucille Beck, Charles Berlin and Rick Talbott ... Jerger organized a founding group of 32 audiologists who met in January 1988 for the first meeting of the American Academy of Audiology ...[at].. the second meeting of the National Task Force on Audiology in February 1988, another member of that Task Force, David Goldstein, reported on his attendance at the Founders meeting".

Thereafter, at the October 1988 Academy of Dispensing Audiologists (ADA), Conference on Professional Education, the "AuD movement" was launched.

=== The Audiology Foundation of America ===
In 1989, the Audiology Foundation of America (AFA) was formed with a charge to "transform Audiology to a doctoral profession with the Au.D. as its distinctive designator". Goldstein, a Purdue University faculty member, and the former head of the Purdue Speech and Hearing clinic served as chair of the AFA for its first ten years. George Osborn, a "founding member of the American Academy of Audiology, also played a leading role in the establishment of the doctor of audiology degree (AuD), serving as co-founder and later chairman of the Audiology Foundation of America". "From the beginning, Goldstein told The Ear Hears, he was confident the AuD would succeed, despite fierce opposition, especially from the academic establishment in audiology. There had been efforts as early as 1949 to create a professional doctorate, but they had gone nowhere. But, said Goldstein, having observed the efforts of optometry and psychology to do the same thing, he had learned what worked and what didn't and had developed a plan that he believed would be successful".

"'The AFA's goal was to "transform audiology into a healthcare profession with the Doctor of Audiology (Au.D.) as the first professional degree. The AFA is committed to fostering the education and training of these audiologists and to promoting the autonomous practice of audiology for the benefit of the general public,' said Susan Paarlberg, executive director of the AFA".

Goldstein "spearheaded the movement that brought that vision to life" and David Goldstein is "commonly regarded as the Father of the AuD" . David Kirkwood, former editor of The Hearing Journal wrote, "Without Dr. Goldstein's determined and tireless leadership of the AuD movement during its first 15 years or so, it's unlikely that audiology today would be anywhere close to becoming a doctoring profession".

This shift in educational and training options for audiologists was not uniformly accepted. The AuD degree program "shook up the status quo" in universities resistant to the proposed changes. Whereas some believed that an AuD degree would diminish knowledge levels and create a version of the profession with a lesser status, and some critics asserted there is a "point to ponder ... whether we are directing students away from the PhD course of study by virtue of developing the professional doctorate option", in "the period from 1990–1992, six independent surveys reported that the majority of audiologists supported the concept of the Au.D. degree".

==== Goldstein Award ====
Although the Audiology Foundation of America (AFA) disbanded after achieving its mission of transforming audiology into a doctoral profession, AFA's David P. Goldstein award, which recognizes an audiologist who made significant contributions to the profession, will live on through the ADA. "The award also holds as core values the importance of setting an example for future audiologists as well as excellence in providing quality patient care".

Past Recipients

- 2016 – Victor Bray, Ph.D.
- 2015 – Eric Hagberg, Au.D.
- 2014 – George Osborne, Ph.D., D.D.S., Au.D.
- 2013 – Brenda Berge, Au.D.
- 2012 – Jim Carroll, Au.D.
- 2011 – Tabitha Parent Buck, Au.D.
- 2010 – Christine Ulinski, Au.D., Kenneth Lowder, Au.D., Deborah Price, Au.D., & Susan Terry, Au.D.
- 2009 – Linda Burba, Au.D., and Richard Burba, MBA
- 2008 – Larry Engelmann, Au.D.
- 2007 – Nancy Green, Au.D.
- 2005 – David Cieliczka, Au.D.

== Universities offering the AuD ==
In 1994, Baylor College of Medicine established the first Au.D. program, followed by Central Michigan University in 1994 and Ball State University (Indiana) in 1995.

The A.T. Still University-Arizona School of Health Sciences (ATSU-ASHS) was also an early adopter of the AuD. Tabitha Parent Buck, was an undergraduate student of Goldstein's at Purdue University, became one of the first AuD graduates in the country, and went on to be a faculty member at ATSU-ASHS.

Today, there are approximately 77 programs offering an Au.D. degree.

== See also ==
- First professional degree
- Hearing test
- Audiology
- Speech
