= Nina Kraus =

American neuroscientist

Nina Giulia Kraus (born September 13, 1952) is a professor at Northwestern University, investigating the neural encoding of speech and music and its plasticity where she is the Hugh S. Knowles Chair.

Her Auditory Neuroscience Lab, also known as Brainvolts, examines the biological processing of sound throughout the life span, how it is disrupted in clinical populations (language disorders; concussion), and how it reacts to differing levels of expertise (music; bilingualism). Her work has shown that the hearing brain is vast—engaging our cognitive, sensory, motor, and reward networks. This perspective is illustrated in her book Of Sound Mind: How Our Brain Constructs a Meaningful Sonic World. Investigations are aimed at improving human communication. Kraus’ work is rooted in a desire to bring scientific understanding into educational and clinical settings.

On the morning of September 1, 2025, Kraus left her home in Evanston, Illinois to take a walk around the neighborhood. She did not bring her phone and her family became concerned when she hadn't returned several hours later. Local newspaper Evanston Round Table interviewed her son within nine hours of her disappearance, at which point the Evanston and Northwestern University police forces had been notified she was missing. The next day, drones were dispatched to search the shoreline of Lake Michigan and a K9 unit was brought in to search the neighborhood. Kraus was missing for a total of 32 hours before being discovered one house over from her home. A neighbor found her behind tall trees and bushes and called out her name, to which she responded. She was transported to the hospital and the circumstances of her disappearance are currently unknown; police do not suspect foul play.

== Book ==
- Kraus, N. (2021). Of Sound Mind: How Our Brain Constructs a Meaningful Sonic World. MIT Press.
