= De Wet Swanepoel =

South African professor of Communication Pathology

- Education: B. Sc University of Pretoria (2000), M. Sc University of Pretoria (2002). PhD University of Pretoria (2005)
- Awards: 2014 The World Academy of Sciences Young National Award in the category of Basic Sciences, Technology and Innovation. The 2016 Silver (S2A3)British Association Medal. The 2019 Oppenheimer memorial Trust Award, The 2019 SASLHA fellowship Award, The 2020 African Academy of Sciences Olusegun Obasanjo Prize,
- Scientific career
- Fields: Communication Pathology, Audiology.
- Workplaces: Ear Science Institute Australia University of Western Australia University of Texas Dallas University of Pretoria

De Wet Swanepoel is a South African professor of Communication Pathology at the Department of Speech-Language Pathology and Audiology University of Pretoria and a Senior Researcher at the Ear Science Institute Australia. He is a member of African Academy of Sciences and a recipient of 2018 African Academy of Sciences Olusegun Obasanjo Prize and Silver (S2A3) British Association Medal.

== Education ==
He received his first degree, B. Communication Pathology (Cum Laude) from University of Pretoria in 2000. In 2002 and 2005 he received a M. Communication Pathology (audiology) and D.Phil. (Communication Pathology) (specialising in audiology), in the same institution.

== Career ==
He started his career as a senior research fellow, in Ear Science Institute Australia. He moved to School of Surgery, University of Western Australia and became an adjunct associate professor. He joined the School of Behavioral and Brain Sciences, Callier Center for Communication Disorders, University of Texas Dallas as an adjunct professor. Eventually, he became a professor at Department of Speech-Language Pathology & Audiology, University of Pretoria.

== Award ==
In 2014, he received the World Academy of Sciences young National Award in the category of Basic Sciences, Technology and Innovation. In 2016, he was awarded Silver (S2A3) British Association Medal. In 2019, he received the Oppenheimer memorial trust award and in the same year, he received his SASLHA fellowship award. In 2020, he received the African Academy of Science Olusegun Obasanjo Prize for Scientific Breakthrough and/or Technological Innovation. In the same year he was elected as a member of the African Academy of Sciences.
