= Philipos C. Loizou =

Professor of electrical engineering (1965–2012)

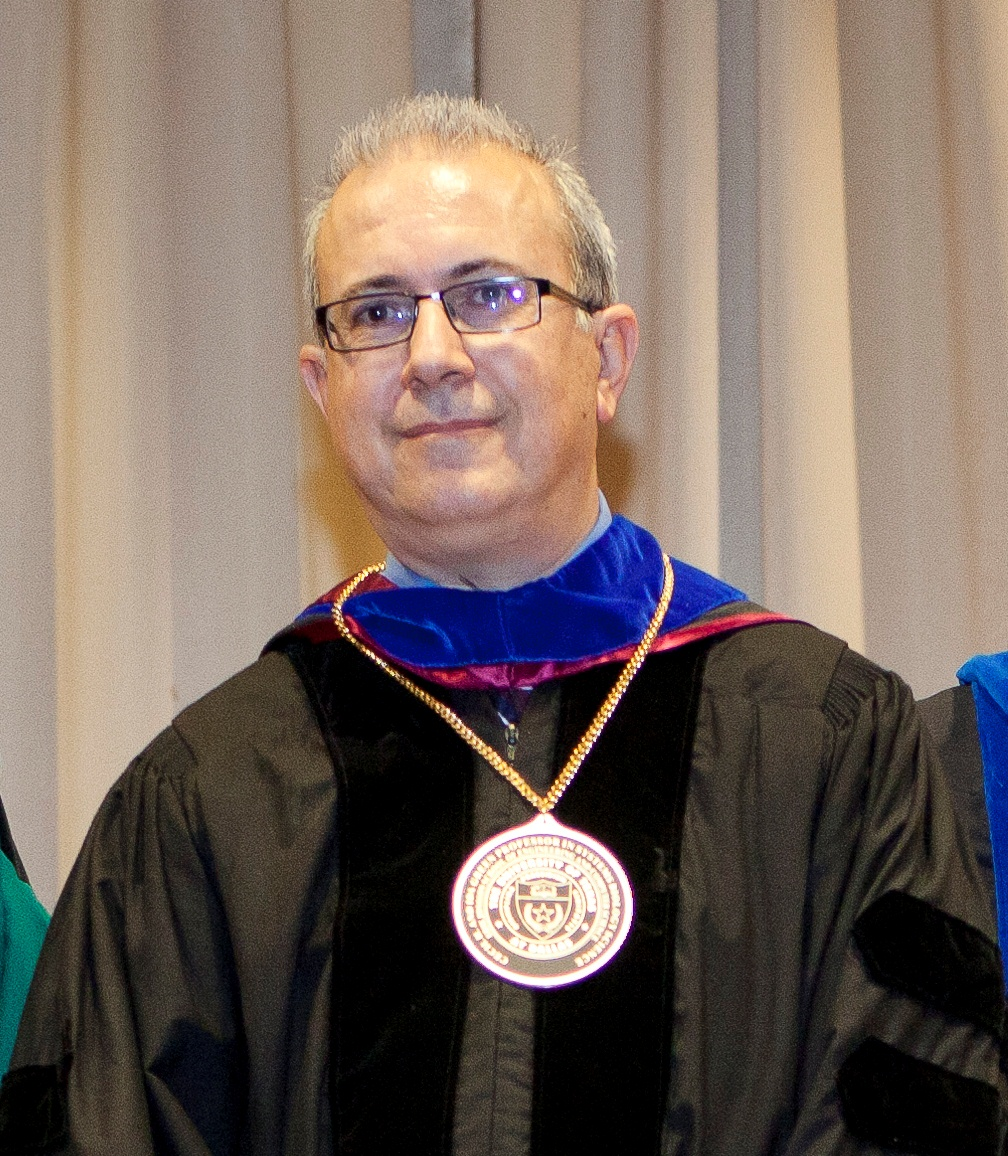
- Born: November 10, 1965; Patriki, Cyprus
- Died: July 22, 2012 (aged 46); Plano, Texas, U.S.
- Education: Arizona State University (ASU), Tempe, Arizona
- Known for: Research in speech enhancement & cochlear implants
- Scientific career
- Fields: Speech enhancement Cochlear implant
- Workplaces: The University of Texas at Dallas; University of Arkansas at Little Rock
- Doctoral advisor: Andreas Spanias

Philipos (Philip) C. Loizou (Greek: Φίλιππος Λοΐζου, November 10, 1965 – July 22, 2012) was Professor in the Department of Electrical Engineering (EE), Erik Jonsson School of Engineering & Computer Science at the University of Texas at Dallas (UTD).

== Career ==
Loizou was an assistant professor at the University of Arkansas, Little Rock (1996 to 1999) prior to joining the Erik Jonsson School of Engineering and Computer Science, where he helped co-found the Center of Robust Speech Systems (CRSS). He established the Speech Processing and Cochlear Implant Laboratories at the University of Texas at Dallas and held the Cecil and Ida Green Chair in the Department of Electrical Engineering since 2009. Loizou developed a noisy speech corpus known as NOIZEUS.
