= Audiology =

Branch of science that studies hearing, balance, and related disorders

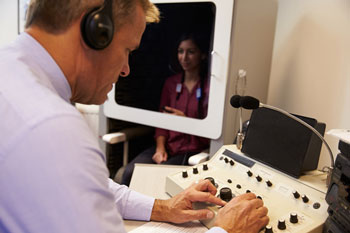
Audiologist doing "Pure Tone Audiometry"

Audiology (from Latin audīre 'to hear'; and from Greek branch of learning -λογία, -logia) is a branch of science that studies hearing, balance, and related disorders. Audiologists treat those with hearing loss and proactively prevent related damage. By employing various testing strategies (e.g. behavioral hearing tests, otoacoustic emission measurements, and electrophysiologic tests), audiologists aim to determine whether someone has normal sensitivity to sounds.

If hearing loss is identified, audiologists determine which portions of hearing (high, middle, or low frequencies) are affected, to what degree (severity of loss), and where the lesion causing the hearing loss is found (outer ear, middle ear, inner ear, auditory nerve and/or central nervous system). If an audiologist determines that a hearing loss or vestibular abnormality is present, they will provide recommendations for interventions or rehabilitation (e.g. hearing aids, cochlear implants, appropriate medical referrals).

In addition to diagnosing audiologic and vestibular pathologies, audiologists can also specialize in rehabilitation of tinnitus, hyperacusis, misophonia, auditory processing disorders, cochlear implant use and/or hearing aid use. Audiologists can provide hearing health care from birth to end-of-life.

== Audiologist ==
An audiologist is a healthcare provider specializing in identifying, diagnosing, treating, and monitoring disorders of the auditory and vestibular systems. Audiologists are trained to diagnose, manage, and/or treat hearing, tinnitus, or balance problems. They dispense, manage, and rehabilitate hearing aids and assess candidacy for and map hearing implants, such as cochlear implants, middle ear implants, and bone conduction implants. They counsel families through a new diagnosis of hearing loss in infants and help teach coping and compensation skills to late-deafened adults. They also help design and implement personal and industrial hearing safety programs, newborn hearing screening programs, school hearing screening programs, and provide special or custom fitted ear plugs and other hearing protection devices to help prevent hearing loss. Audiologists are trained to evaluate peripheral vestibular disorders originating from pathologies of the vestibular portion of the inner ear. They also provide treatment for certain vestibular and balance disorders, such as benign paroxysmal positional vertigo. In addition, many audiologists work as auditory or acoustic scientists in a research capacity.

Audiologists are trained in anatomy and physiology, hearing aids, cochlear implants, electrophysiology, acoustics, psychophysics and psychoacoustics, neurology, vestibular function and assessment, balance disorders, counseling, and communication options such as sign language. They may also run a neonatal hearing screening program, which has been made compulsory in many countries (for example, US, UK, and Indian hospitals). An audiologist usually graduates with one of the following qualifications: BSc, MSc (Audiology), AuD, PhD, or ScD, depending on the program and country attended. It is necessary to keep in mind that the term "Audiologist" does not refer to same title or qualifications across the countries.

== History ==
The use of the terms "audiology" and "audiologist" in publications has been traced back only as far as 1946. The creator of the term remains unknown, but Berger identified possible originators as Mayer BA Schier, Willard B Hargrave, Stanley Nowak, Norman Canfield, or Raymond Carhart. In a biographical profile by Robert Galambos, Hallowell Davis is credited with coining the term in the 1940s, saying the then-prevalent term "auricular training" sounded like a method of teaching people how to wiggle their ears. The first US university course for audiologists was offered by Carhart at Northwestern University, in 1946.

Audiology was born of interdisciplinary collaboration. The substantial prevalence of hearing loss observed in the veteran population after World War II inspired the creation of the field as it is known today. The International Society of Audiology (ISA) was founded in 1952 to facilitate the knowledge, protection and rehabilitation of human hearing and to serve as an advocate for the profession and for the hearing impaired throughout the world." It promotes interactions among national societies, associations and organizations that have similar missions, through the organization of a biannual world congress, through the publication of the scientific peer-reviewed International Journal of Audiology and by offering support to the World Health Organization's efforts towards addressing the needs of the hearing impaired and deaf community.

== Requirements for practicing audiology ==
The International Society of Audiology maintains Global Audiology, which is a portal in Wikiversity that provides information on audiology education and practice around the world. Summary information is provided below:

=== Albania ===
Audiology and speech-language pathology training in Albania is provided through university-based programmes. Available professional training pathways include master's-level education in Speech Pathology, with clinical training requirements incorporated into professional preparation. The Albanian Order of Nurses (UISH) is identified as having a role in professional registration for speech and language professionals. However, the specific regulatory arrangements and registration requirements for audiologists require further confirmation.

=== Algeria ===
The practice of audioprothesis is recognised within the public healthcare system, with Audioprothésistes (hearing aid professionals) providing hearing aid services. A national paramedical higher education qualification in rehabilitation, specialising in audioprothesis, is recognised for recruitment into public healthcare positions. Their scope of practice includes hearing aid provision, fitting, technical follow-up, counselling and participation in hearing screening. Separate authorisation requirements apply to private practice. However, Audioprothésistes should be distinguished from independently qualified clinical audiologists, as the professional roles and qualifications are not necessarily equivalent.

=== Australia ===
In Australia, audiologists must hold a Master of Audiology, Master of Clinical Audiology, Master of Audiology Studies, or alternatively a bachelor's degree from overseas certified by the private agency Vocational Education, Training and Assessment Services (VETASSESS). Although audiologists in Australia are not required to be members of any professional body, audiology graduates can undergo a clinical training program or internship leading to accreditation with Audiology Australia (AudA) or the Australian College of Audiology (ACAud), which involves supervised practice and professional development, and typically lasts one year.

To provide rehabilitative services to eligible pensioners, war veterans, and children and young adults under 26 as part of the Hearing Services Program, an audiologist must hold a qualified practitioner (QP) number, which can be sought by first obtaining accreditation.

=== Bangladesh ===
A BSc (Hons) in audiology and speech-language pathology is required.

=== Brazil ===
In Brazil, audiology training is part of speech pathology and audiology undergraduate, four-year courses. The University of São Paulo was the first university to offer a bachelor's degree, and it started operations in 1977. At the federal level, the recognition of the educational programs and the profession of speech pathologists and audiologists took place on December 9, 1981, signed by President João Figueiredo (law no. 6965). The terms "audiology" and "audiologist" can be tracked in Brazilian publications since 1946. The work of audiologists in Brazil was described in 2007.

=== Canada ===
In Canada, a master's of science (MSc) is the minimum requirement for practicing audiology. The profession is regulated in New Brunswick, Quebec, Ontario, Manitoba, Saskatchewan, Alberta, and British Columbia, where it is illegal to practice without being registered as a full member of the appropriate provincial regulatory body.

=== Egypt ===
Audiology in Egypt is primarily structured within the medical specialty of audio-vestibular medicine. Practitioners typically qualify first in medicine before undertaking postgraduate specialisation in audio-vestibular medicine. Training pathways include a master's degree, doctoral qualification or Egyptian Board specialisation in audio-vestibular medicine. The Supreme Council of Egyptian Universities and the Ministry of Health's Egyptian Board are involved in the relevant educational and professional pathways.

=== France ===
The practice of hearing aid provision in France is regulated through the profession of Hearing Aid Specialists (Audioprothésistes). Practitioners are required to hold an approved state diploma in hearing prosthetics (Diplôme d'État d'audioprothésiste) to practise. Foreign qualifications require recognition by the relevant French authorities. Hearing aid provision also requires a prior medical prescription. The profession is regulated through the relevant French professional requirements and should be distinguished from university-trained clinical audiology.

=== Germany ===
Hearing aid provision in Germany is primarily undertaken by Hearing Aid Acousticians (Hörakustiker), who follow a regulated vocational training pathway. Training includes theoretical and practical education in hearing assessment, hearing instrument fitting and patient counselling. The profession follows a formal vocational trade structure, with a master craftsman examination (Meisterprüfung) relevant to independent business ownership and operation. International applicants may require an assessment of their foreign vocational qualifications for equivalence. This pathway differs from university-trained clinical audiology.

=== Ghana ===
Audiology in Ghana is provided by professionals trained in hearing and speech sciences, with undergraduate and postgraduate pathways available. The Allied Health Professions Council (AHPC) regulates audiology as part of the allied health professions and oversees professional registration. The Speech Therapists and Audiologists Association of Ghana (STAAG) supports professional representation and development. Available training pathways include undergraduate and master's-level qualifications, with clinical internship requirements forming part of professional preparation.

=== India ===
To practice audiology, professionals need a bachelor's degree in audiology and speech language pathology (BASLP), master's degree in audiology and speech language pathology (MASLP) or Masters degree in Audiology (MSc Audiology) and registration with the Rehabilitation Council of India (RCI).

=== Indonesia ===
Audiology in Indonesia is incorporated into the broader rehabilitation and speech therapy professions. University-based training includes bachelor's-level education, with audiologists involved in hearing assessment and rehabilitation services. The Ministry of Health has a role in professional regulation, while the Indonesian Speech Therapists Association supports professional development and the advancement of speech and hearing services.

=== Ireland ===
The practice of Audiology in Ireland is supported by university-based education and recognised professional qualifications. Approved qualifications for appointment as an audiologist in publicly funded healthcare services include a Bachelor of Science (Honours) in Audiology, a postgraduate diploma or a master's degree in Audiology from a recognised university. The Department of Health is responsible for validating qualifications for employment in the publicly funded health sector, including the Health Service Executive (HSE). Audiologists provide diagnostic and rehabilitative hearing services, including hearing assessments and hearing aid management.

=== Malaysia ===
Three Malaysian educational institutions offer degrees in audiology.

=== Nigeria ===
Audiology training in Nigeria includes undergraduate programmes in Audiology and related qualifications in Speech and Language Pathology. The Medical Rehabilitation Therapists Board of Nigeria (MRTB) is identified as the regulatory body for the profession. Training pathways include a bachelor's degree in Audiology or a relevant qualification specialising in Audiology and Speech Pathology, followed by a period of supervised clinical practice or internship.

=== United Kingdom ===
There are currently five routes to becoming a registered audiologist:

- FdSc in hearing aid audiology
- BSc in audiology
- MSc in audiology
- Fast-track conversion Diploma for those with a BSc in another relevant science subject, available at Southampton, Manchester, UCL, London, and Edinburgh
- BSc(Hons) in clinical physiology (audiology) available at Glasgow Caledonian University (all applicants must be NHS employees)

=== United States ===
In the United States, audiologists are regulated by state licensure or registration in all 50 states and the District of Columbia. Starting in 2007, the doctor of audiology (AuD) became the entry-level degree for clinical practice for some states, with most states expected to follow this requirement very soon, as there are no longer any professional programs in audiology that offer the master's degree. Minimum requirements for the AuD degree include a minimum of 75 semester hours of post-baccalaureate study, meeting prescribed competencies, passing a national exam offered by Praxis Series of the Educational Testing Service, and practicum experience equivalent to 12 months of full-time, supervised experience. Most states have continuing education renewal requirements that must be met to stay licensed. Audiologists can also earn certification from the American Speech-Language-Hearing Association or the American Board of Audiology (ABA). Currently, there are over 70 AuD programs in the United States.

In the past, audiologists have typically held a master's degree and the appropriate healthcare license. However, in the 1990s, the profession transitioned to a doctoral level as a minimum requirement. In the United States, starting in 2007, audiologists were required to receive a doctoral degree (AuD or PhD) in audiology from an accredited university graduate or professional program before practicing. All states require licensing, and audiologists may also carry national board certification from the American Board of Audiology or a certificate of clinical competence in audiology (CCC-A) from the American Speech-Language-Hearing Association.

=== Pakistan ===
In Pakistan, a master's or doctoral degree in audiology is required to practice this profession. This medical degree must come from a recognized institute, most of which are government. Otherwise, the person didn't get a license to practice audiology. The Pakistan Medical Commission issues the practicing license to all medical students. Besides these, the person who provides the medical instruments to these doctors should also have the certificate of accreditation issued by the Pakistan National Accreditation Council.

=== Portugal ===
The exercise of the audiologist profession in Portugal necessarily implies the qualifications degree in audiology or legally equivalent as defined in Decree-Law 320/99 of August 11 Article 4.

=== South Africa ===
In South Africa, there are currently five institutions offering audiology training. The institutions offer different qualifications that make one eligible to practice audiology in South Africa. The qualifications are as follows: I) B. Audiology, II) BSc. Audiology, III) B. Communication Pathology (Audiology), and IV) B. Speech-Language Pathology and Audiology (BSLP&A). All practicing audiologists are required to be registered with the Health Professional Council of South Africa (HPCSA).

=== Turkey ===
Audiology in Turkey started in 1968 as an audiology master's degree program at Hacettepe University Faculty of Medicine, Department of Ear, Nose and Throat. The program, which was carried out as Audiology until 1989, has been revised this year and continued as "Audiology and Speech Disorders" Master's and Doctoral education. The first undergraduate program was opened in 2011, and as of 2011, Audiologist has become a profession defined and officially recognized by the state of the Republic of Turkey.

=== Nepal ===
To practice as an audiologist in Nepal, an individual must complete at least an undergraduate degree in Speech and Hearing Science, typically offered as a Bachelor in Audiology and Speech-Language Pathology (BASLP). In Nepal, this undergraduate program is provided by the Institute of Medicine (IOM) under Tribhuvan University, as well as by the National Academy of Medical Sciences (NAMS) based at Bir Hospital.

At the undergraduate level, professionals are trained to identify hearing loss across the lifespan and to assess and diagnose hearing disorders using behavioral and basic electrophysiological measures. Their training also includes the provision of intervention services such as hearing aids and assistive listening devices, and auditory training.

At present, there is no university in Nepal that offers a postgraduate (master's/doctorate) degree in audiology. Advanced audiological services—such as cochlear implant mapping, intraoperative monitoring, comprehensive vestibular evaluation and management, and tinnitus assessment and management are therefore typically performed by audiologists who have obtained postgraduate training outside Nepal.

The Speech and Hearing Association of Nepal (SHAN) is the professional association representing over 120 professionals in audiology and speech language pathology. Established in 1999, SHAN is Nepal's premier professional and scientific association for these disciplines.

=== Mainland China ===
Audiology in mainland China is developing within the broader fields of rehabilitation and speech and hearing sciences. University-level training pathways include bachelor's-level education in related disciplines. The professional structure differs from countries with independently regulated audiology professions, and the available international review does not identify a dedicated national audiologist licensing body. Hearing assessment and rehabilitation services are provided within the wider healthcare and rehabilitation system.

=== New Zealand ===
The practice of Audiology in New Zealand is supported by postgraduate university education and professional accreditation through the New Zealand Audiological Society (NZAS). Audiologists are required to hold a Master of Audiology or an equivalent recognised qualification to qualify for full professional membership. Graduates from recognised programmes at the University of Auckland and the University of Canterbury complete supervised clinical practice and a clinical competency assessment before obtaining full membership. Overseas-qualified applicants must undergo an assessment of their qualifications and clinical experience. The profession operates through a professional self-regulation model rather than statutory audiologist registration.

=== Philippines ===
Audiology in the Philippines is offered through university-based education in communication sciences and related disciplines. Professional training pathways include postgraduate-level education in Audiology, with clinical preparation forming part of professional development. The Professional Regulation Commission (PRC) regulates certain communication-related health professions, including speech-language pathology. However, audiology does not appear to follow the same statutory registration pathway as speech-language pathology, and the Association of Clinical Audiologists of the Philippines supports the professional community.

=== Russia ===
The public medical facilities, as well as private clinics and individual professionals, should obtain a medical activity license in audiology from the federal health surveillance service to perform diagnostics, treatment, and hearing aid and speech processor fittings. Audiology standard on staff educational level and equipment has to be met. The dispensing of hearing aids does not require a special license.

=== Saudi Arabia ===
Audiology training in Saudi Arabia includes undergraduate qualifications in Speech and Hearing Sciences, followed by postgraduate clinical specialisation. The Saudi Commission for Health Specialties (SCFHS) oversees the classification and registration of healthcare practitioners. Training pathways include a bachelor's degree in Speech and Hearing Sciences and postgraduate qualifications in Clinical Audiology. Clinical internship and supervised experience form part of professional preparation.

=== Singapore ===
Audiology services in Singapore are delivered within a multidisciplinary healthcare system, with hearing assessment and rehabilitation provided through public and private healthcare services. The Allied Health Professions Council (AHPC) regulates several allied health professions under the Allied Health Professions Act 2011. However, audiologists are not included among the five professional groups currently listed for AHPC regulation. The professional registration and qualification arrangements for audiologists should therefore be distinguished from those of regulated allied health professions such as speech-language therapists.

=== Spain ===
The scope of practice for hearing care professionals in Spain is currently fragmented. The hearing aid dispenser is licensed to fit and dispense hearing aids but is not recognized as having the full clinical competencies of a general audiologist. ENT specialists hold the broadest medical authority over ear-related conditions. Speech therapists hold a university degree and are regulated health professionals, but their scope is primarily linguistic and communicative rather than audiological. It is expected that, in the coming years, the recently established undergraduate degrees in audiology, together with the work of professional audiology societies, will support the formal recognition of general audiologist as a new regulated profession in Spain. This development would broaden the scope of audiological practice, enabling general audiologists to provide high-quality services across both the public and private hearing healthcare systems.

=== Sri Lanka ===
The development of Audiology in Sri Lanka was developed through university-based education and the expansion of public and private hearing healthcare services. The University of Kelaniya introduced a four-year bachelor's degree in Speech and Hearing Sciences in 2008 which replaced the earlier diploma-level training pathways. Like in other Asian countries, Audiologists provide diagnostic hearing assessments, hearing aid fitting, auditory rehabilitation, and vestibular services. However, there is lack of access, particularly in rural setting.

According to Caldera et al. (2023), only 33 of 647 government hospitals had audiology units, while 36 private centers across nine districts provided audiological evaluations. Audiologists are regulated through the Sri Lanka Medical Council, while the Lanka Academy of Audiologists supports professional development. The major challenges include workforce shortages, limited infrastructure, hearing aid affordability, and the absence of nationwide universal hearing screening. Efforts to expand professional training, early identification, and community-based hearing healthcare remain important.

=== Sweden ===
The practice of Audiology in Sweden is regulated through a licensing system overseen by the Swedish National Board of Health and Welfare (Socialstyrelsen). Audiologists (Audionomer) are required to hold a recognised professional qualification and obtain a licence to practise, as the professional title is protected. International applicants must provide evidence of their qualifications, professional standing and proficiency in Swedish, Danish or Norwegian. Additional requirements may apply to applicants with qualifications obtained outside the EU/EEA. Socialstyrelsen is responsible for professional licensing and regulation.

=== Thailand ===
Audiology in Thailand is provided within the broader field of Speech-Language Pathology and Audiology. University-based training includes bachelor's-level education, with audiologists involved in hearing assessment, rehabilitation and related clinical services. The Ministry of Public Health has a role in professional regulation, while the Thai Speech-Language and Hearing Association supports professional development and the advancement of the disciplines.

=== Vietnam ===
Hearing healthcare in Vietnam is provided within the broader rehabilitation profession. University-level training in rehabilitation includes preparation for hearing-related services, although a distinct university-based audiology qualification and independent audiologist registration pathway were not identified in the available international review. The Vietnamese Audiology Association supports professional development and the advancement of audiology in the country.

=== Professional Audiology Organization Across the Globe ===
There are several professional audiology organizations operating at international, regional, and national levels to advance hearing and balance healthcare, promote research, support professional education, and develop clinical practice standards. The International Society of Audiology (ISA) was established in 1952 to promote global collaboration through scientific publications, professional networks, and the World Congress of Audiology. Other international and regional organizations include the European Federation of Audiology Societies (EFAS), the International Evoked Response Audiometry Study Group (IERASG), and the Coalition for Global Hearing Health (CGHH)

At the national level, professional associations include the American Academy of Audiology (AAA), American Speech-Language-Hearing Association (ASHA), and Academy of Doctors of Audiology (ADA) in the United States; the British Society of Audiology (BSA) and British Academy of Audiology (BAA) in the United Kingdom; the Canadian Academy of Audiology (CAA) and Speech-Language and Audiology Canada (SAC); Audiology Australia; the New Zealand Audiological Society (NZAS); the German Society of Audiology (DGA); the Brazilian Academy of Audiology (ABA); and the South African Association of Audiologists (SAAA). These organizations contribute to professional advocacy, continuing education, research, and the development of audiological services, although there are some variation in the role and responsibilities across countries.

=== Scope of Practice ===
The scope of audiology practice includes preventing, identifying, assessing, and managing hearing and balance disorders across the lifespan. Audiologists provide services such as hearing screening, behavioral and electrophysiological hearing assessments, vestibular evaluations, hearing aid fitting, cochlear implant assessment and programming, and auditory rehabilitation. Depending on their training, certification, and professional responsibilities, they may also provide tinnitus management, hearing conservation services, and assessment and management of auditory processing disorders. Audiologists work in different work settings, including hospitals, private clinics, educational institutions, rehabilitation centers, and research settings.

The scope of audiology practice varies across countries/continent depending on professional education, licensing requirements, healthcare systems, and access to specialized services. For example, in the United States, audiologists provide a broad range of diagnostic and rehabilitative services under state licensure. In Brazil, audiology is practiced within the speech-language pathology and audiology profession, with services including hearing and vestibular assessment, hearing aid fitting, and cochlear implant programming. In France, hearing healthcare responsibilities are divided among otolaryngologists, audioprosthetists, and speech-language therapists, with audioprosthetists primarily responsible for hearing aid selection, fitting, and follow-up . Similarly, in Germany, hearing healthcare involves several professional groups, including otolaryngologists, hearing aid acousticians, and audiometrists. In Nepal, audiologists with undergraduate qualifications provide basic diagnostic and rehabilitative services, while more specialized services, such as cochlear implant programming and comprehensive vestibular assessment, are generally associated with postgraduate training (Master of Science in Audiology).

Audiologists also contribute to public health through newborn hearing screening, occupational hearing conservation programme, and community hearing healthcare.

== Notable audiologists ==
- Robert Beiny
- Chris Campbell
- Raymond Carhart
- John Craton
- Harvey Dillon
- Leo Doerfler
- Richard Dowell
- Marion Downs
- Judy R. Dubno
- Kirsty Durward
- Deanna Frazier Gordon
- Sandra Gordon-Salant
- Ira Hirsh
- Sharon Kujawa
- Philipos C. Loizou
- Brian Moore
- Kevin Munro
- Bolajoko Olubukunola Olusanya
- Pierre de Villiers Pienaar
- Elly Pourasef
- Alma Powell
- Anu Sharma
- Susan Shore
- Iréne Slättengren
- Dafydd Stephens
- Richard S. Van Wagoner
- S. J. Watson
- James Yearsley
- Zhang Ling

== See also ==
- Audiology and hearing health professionals in developed and developing countries
- Auditory brainstem response (ABR)
- Auditory agnosia
- Auditory processing disorder
- Auditory verbal agnosia
- Audiometrist
- Audiometry
- Balance disorder
- Bone anchored hearing aid (BAHA)
- Cochlear implant
- Computational audiology
- Dichotic listening test
- Earplug
- Electronystagmography (ENG/VNG)
- Global Audiology
- Hearing Aid
- Hearing impairment
- International Society of Audiology
- Listening
- Noise induced hearing loss
- Otoacoustic emissions
- Otolaryngology
- Otology
- Otoscope
- Speech and language pathology
- Speech banana
- Spatial hearing loss
- Tympanometry
- World Hearing Day
