= Kresge Hearing Research Institute =

Institute at the University of Michigan

- Type: Public
- Established: 1963
- Location: Ann Arbor, Michigan, United States; 42°17′3.4″N 83°44′1.5″W
- Website: http://www.khri.med.umich.edu/

The Kresge Hearing Research Institute is an institute of Otolaryngology of the Department of Otolaryngology in the University of Michigan.

The research institute was officially opened in 1963 by Merle Lawrence to investigate the human hearing and causes of deafness.

In 2005, the discovery of being able to regrow cochlea hair nerves in guinea pigs at KHRI made international news.
