= International Journal of Audiology =

- Discipline: Audiology
- Language: English

Publication details
- History: 1962-present
- Publisher: Taylor & Francis
- Frequency: Monthly
- Impact factor: 2.0 (2025)

Standard abbreviations
- ISO 4: Int. J. Audiol.

Indexing
- ISSN: 1499-2027 (print); 1708-8186 (web)
- LCCN: 2002260061
- OCLC no.: 48909035
- Scandinavian Audiology
- ISSN: 0105-0397
- British Journal of Audiology
- ISSN: 0300-5364

Links
- Journal homepage; Online access; Online archive; Scandinavian Audiology; British Journal of Audiology

The International Journal of Audiology is a monthly peer-reviewed medical journal covering research in audiology, including psychoacoustics, anatomy, physiology, cellular and molecular biology, genetics, neuroscience, speech and hearing sciences and rehabilitation devices. It is an official journal of the British Society of Audiology, the International Society of Audiology, and the Nordic Audiological Society.

The journal was established in 1962 as Audiology, obtaining its current title after a merger with the British Journal of Audiology, and Scandinavian Audiology that took place in 2002. It is published by Taylor & Francis and the editor-in-chief is De Wet Swanepoel (University of Pretoria).

According to the Journal Citation Reports, the journal has an impact factor of 2.0 (2025).
