= Hearing Research =

- Discipline: Audiology
- Language: English
- Edited by: Manuel S. Malmierca

Publication details
- History: 1978-present
- Publisher: Elsevier
- Frequency: Monthly
- Impact factor: 2.824 (2014)

Standard abbreviations
- ISO 4: Hear. Res.

Indexing
- ISSN: 0378-5955

Links
- Journal homepage; Online access

The Hearing Research is a peer-reviewed monthly journal that publishes research work with basic peripheral and central auditory mechanisms.

== Indexing and abstracting ==
According to the Journal Citation Reports, the journal has a 2017 impact factor of 2.824. The journal in indexed in the following bibliographic databases:

- BIOSIS
- Elsevier BIOBASE
- Chemical Abstracts
- Current Contents/Life Sciences
- MEDLINE
- EMBASE
- INSPEC
- Pascal et Francis (INST-CNRS)
- Reference Update
- Scopus
