= International Society of Audiology =

Audiology organization

The International Society of Audiology (ISA) was founded in 1952 to "facilitate the knowledge, protection and rehabilitation of human hearing" and to "serve as an advocate for the profession and for the hearing impaired throughout the world". It serves as the professional association for those who work in audiology and related fields of knowledge, from all over the world. The ISA is constituted as a corporate body by Article 60 et seq, of the Swiss Civil Code, registered in the Swiss register du Commerce de Genève.

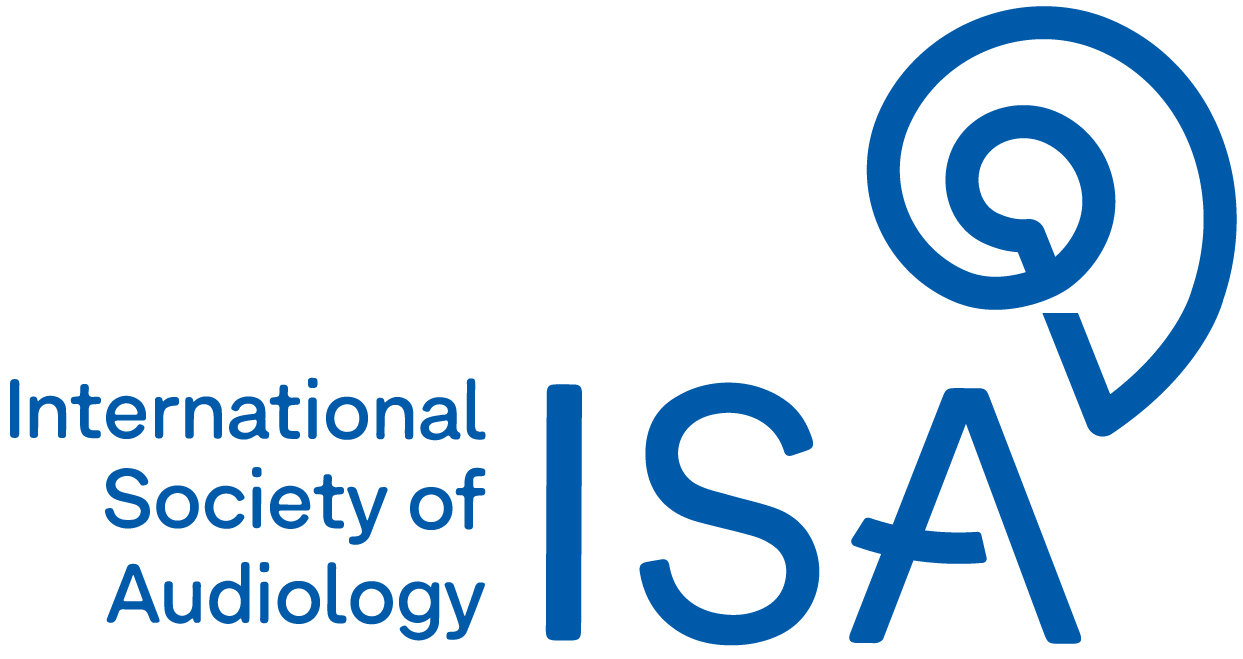
Logo International Society of Audiology

The ISA strives to promote interactions among societies, associations and organizations that have similar missions. It works towards this goal by focusing on three main activities:

- organizing a biannual world congresses. At its biennial World Congress, the International Society of Audiology presents the Aram Glorig award to recognize a person who has had a “distinguished career in Audiology.”
- organizing open-access webinars,
- publishing the scientific peer-reviewed International Journal of Audiology and
- supporting the World Health Organization by advancing the interests of those working in audiology or related fields, the hearing impaired and deaf community.

In addition, working groups can formed at any time with the approval of the ISA executive. Each working group normally includes an ISA executive member as an identified liaison and an ISA member as the Convener.

== Affiliate societies ==
Regional, state, provincial, or national societies in which members engage in clinical, research, or teaching of some aspect of audiology can apply to become an Affiliate society of the International Society. Affiliate societies are entitled to appoint representatives to the ISA General Assembly based on a formula of one representative for each twenty-five (25) fully paid up members of the International Society of Audiology.

== See also ==
- World Hearing Day
- Global Audiology
