= Raymond Carhart =

American audiologist

Raymond Theodore Carhart
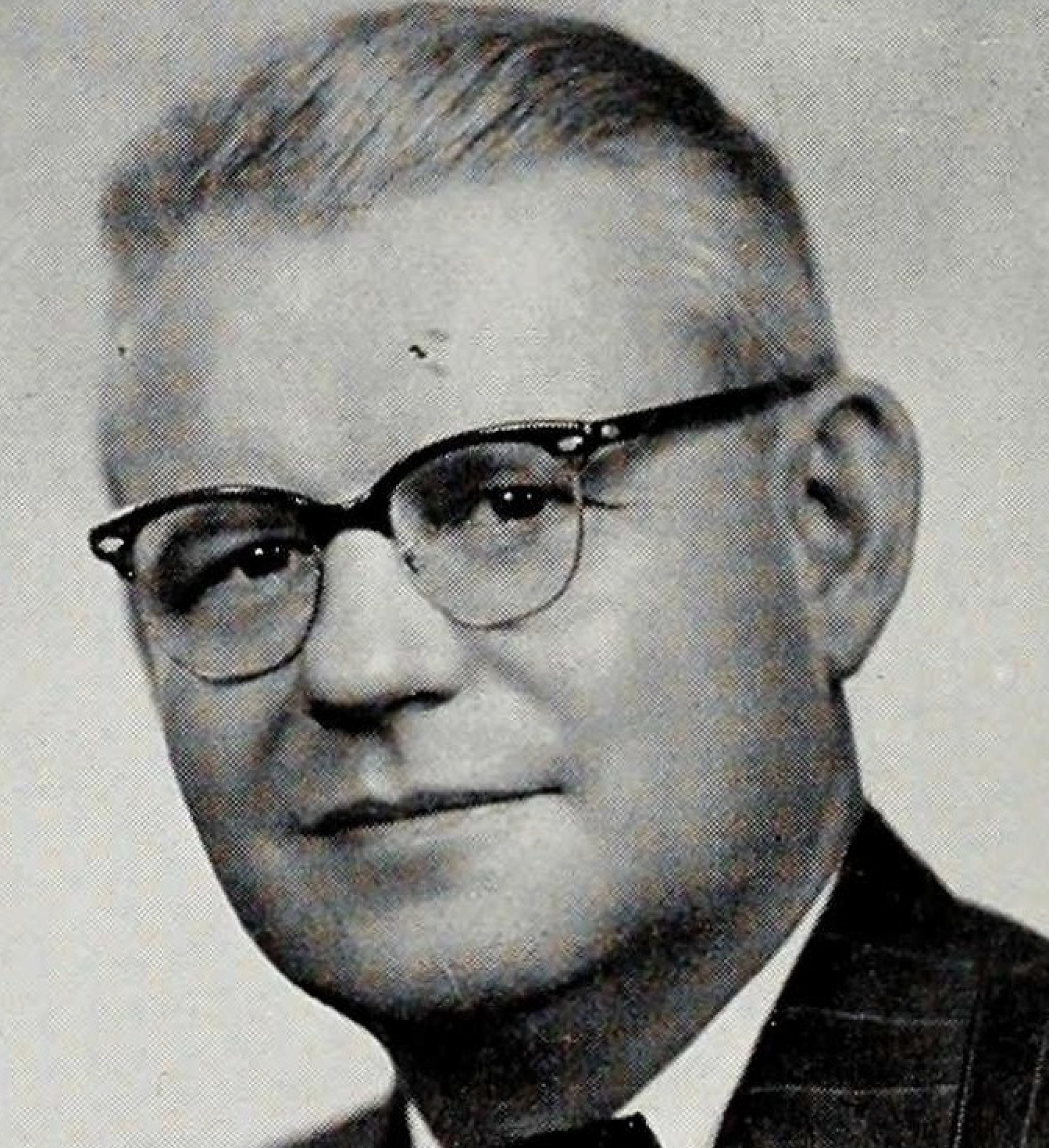
- Carhart in 1958
- Born: March 28, 1912; Mexico City, Mexico
- Died: October 2, 1975 (aged 63)
- Education: Dakota Wesleyan University, (BA); Northwestern University, (MA), (PhD)
- Spouses: Mary Ellen Westfall (m. 1935; died 1971) Jeanette Davis Grunig (m. 1973)
- Children: 3

Raymond Theodore Carhart (March 28, 1912 - October 2, 1975) was a Speech-Language Pathologist (SLP). As a founder and pioneer of the science, he is frequently referred to as the "Father of Audiology."

== Early life and education ==
Carhart was born on March 28, 1912, in Mexico City to Raymond Albert and Edith (Noble) Carhart. Raymond Albert was a Methodist missionary whose own father, Albert Elijah Carhart, was a temperance preacher.

Carhart studied at Dakota Wesleyan University (BA in Speech and Psychology, 1932) and at Northwestern University (MA, 1934, and PhD, 1936, in Speech Pathology, Experimental Phonetics and Psychology).

== Research and career ==
Carhart remained at Northwestern until 1944, first as instructor in Speech Re-education and later as Assistant (1940) and Associate (1943) Professor. He joined the US Army Medical Administrative Corps in 1944, working in Butler, Pennsylvania until 1946. He returned to Northwestern in 1947, where he remained until his death in 1975.

== Carhart notch ==
Carhart notch effect is a decrease in the bone-conduction hearing at the 2000 Hz region of patients with otosclerosis first reported by and therefore named after Raymond Carhart.

== Notes ==
- Hall, James W.; H. Gustav Mueller (1998). Audiologists Desk Reference: Audiologic Management, Rehabilitation and Terminology. Thomson Delmar Learning. ISBN 1-56593-711-2., p. 912
- Hall, James W. (1999). Handbook of Otoacoustic Emissions. Thomson Delmar Learning. ISBN 1-56593-873-9., p. 2: the Father of Audiology himself, Raymond Carhart at Northwestern University..."
