= Herel =

Herel is a surname. Notable people with the surname include:

- Jozef Herel (1951–2013), Slovak footballer and manager
- Petr Herel (born 1943), Czechoslovakia-born Australian artist
- Ronnie Herel, British DJ and radio personality

== See also ==
- Harel
- Herrell
- Merel
