= Merle =

Merle may refer to:

== People and fictional characters ==
- Merle (given name), a list of men, women and fictional characters
- Merle (surname), a list of people

== Others ==
- Merle (dog coat), a pattern in dogs’ coats
- Merle (grape), another name for the wine grape Merlot
- Akaflieg München Mü17 Merle, a German glider originally built in 1938 for the 1940 Olympics gliding competition
- MS Phocine, a ferry formerly named MS Merle
- A Crusader fort near Tantura on the coast of Israel
- The French name for the common blackbird

== See also ==
- Merl (disambiguation)
- Merles, a commune in southern France
