= Merrill (surname) =

Merrill is a surname of English origin. Notable people with the surname include:

- Aaron S. Merrill, US Navy rear admiral during World War II
- Amanda Merrill, American Democratic member of the New Hampshire Senate
- Ayres Phillips Merrill (1825–1883), American planter and diplomat
- Beverly Ann Merrill, star of The Real Housewives of New Jersey
- Charles E. Merrill, American philanthropist, stockbroker, and co-founder of Merrill Lynch
- Charles E. Merrill Jr., American educator
- Dina Merrill (1923–2017), American actress
- Elmer Drew Merrill, botanist
- Elmer Truesdell Merrill, classical scholar
- Estelle M. H. Merrill (pen name, Jean Kincaid; 1858–1908), journalist, editor
- Eugene H. Merrill (academic)
- Eugene H. Merrill (politician)
- Forrest Merrill (born 1996), American football player
- Frank Merrill, US Army major general; commander of Merrill's Marauders
- Frank Thayer Merrill (1848–1936), American illustrator
- Gary Merrill (1915–1990), American actor
- George F. Merrill, American politician
- George P. Merrill, American chemist, geologist and pedologist, winner of the 1922 J. Lawrence Smith Medal
- Helen Merrill, American Jazz vocalist
- Helen Maud Merrill (1865–1943), American litterateur, poet
- Herbert A. Merrill (1855–1926), American dentist
- Herbert M. Merrill (1871–1956), New York Socialist assemblyman 1912
- Jackson Merrill (born 2003), American baseball player
- James Merrill, American poet
- James Griswold Merrill, American Congregational minister and university administrator
- Jan Merrill, American middle distance runner
- Jenny B. Merrill (1854–1934), American educator, author
- John Merrill (disambiguation), multiple people
- Jon Merrill (born 1992), American ice hockey player
- Karl Merrill (1900–1984), American farmer
- Katherine Merrill (1876–1962), American artist
- Kieth Merrill, American filmmaker
- Lewis Merrill, US Army officer in civil war; later fought against KKK.
- Merrill Ashley (born 1950), American ballet dancer and répétiteur born Linda Michelle Merrill
- Lorenzo Merrill, American politician
- Lou Merrill, American actor
- Margaret Manton Merrill (1859–1893), British-American journalist, writer, translator, elocutionist
- Maud A. Merrill, American psychologist
- Monique Merrill, American ski mountaineer
- Nathaniel Merrill, American stage director and opera director
- Orsamus Cook Merrill, American politician
- Paul W. Merrill (1887–1961), American astronomer
- Philip Merrill, American diplomat, publisher, banker, and philanthropist
- Richard B. Merrill, American inventor of Foveon X3 sensor
- Robert Merrill, American operatic baritone singer
- Russel Merrill, US Navy pilot during World War I, and pioneer of aviation in Alaska
- Samuel Merrill (disambiguation), multiple people
- Sarah M. Dawson Merrill, American educator
- Stephen Merrill (disambiguation), multiple people
- Thomas W. Merrill, American legal scholar
- Wayne R. Merrill, United States Navy submarine commander in World War II

== See also ==
- Merrill (given name)
- Merrill (disambiguation)
- Merril (given name and surname)
