= Murielle (given name) =

Murielle is a feminine given name. People with the name include:

- Murielle Ahouré (born 1987), Ivorian sprinter
- Murielle Celimene, a representative of Martinique at Miss Earth 2004
- Murielle Lepvraud (born 1974), French politician
- Murielle Magellan (born 1967), French writer and theater director
- Murielle Adrienne Orais, a model, environmentalist, nurse, and beauty queen from the Philippines
- Murielle Telio, American actress

== See also ==
- Muriel (given name)
