= Meryle =

Meryle is a given name. Notable people with the given name include:

- Meryle Fitzgerald (1925–2004), American baseball player
- Meryle Joy Reagon (born 1942), American civil rights movement activist
- Meryle Secrest, American biographer and art collector

== See also ==
- Meryl, another given name
