= Richard Merrill =

Richard Merrill may refer to:

- Richard Merrill (computer scientist), inventor of the programming language FOCAL
- Richard B. Merrill, American inventor of Foveon X3 sensor
- Richard L. Morrill, academic
- Dick Merrill, aviation pioneer

== See also ==
- Richard Merrill Atkinson, U.S. Representative from Tennessee
- Richard Merrill Rowell, Distinguished Flying Cross recipient
- USS Richard M. Rowell (DE-403), WWII navy ship named after Richard Merrill Rowell
- Richard M. Cohen (Richard Merrill Cohen), American journalist
- Richard M. Mills Jr. (Richard Merrill Mills Jr.), American diplomat
- Dick Sudhalter (Richard Merrill Sudhalter), American jazz musician and writer
- Merrill (surname)
