= Merrill (given name) =

- Pronunciation: /ˈmɛrəl/
- Gender: Unisex
- Language: English

Origin
- Language: English
- Origin: From surname or place names
- Meaning: From an English surname that was derived either from the given name Muriel or from place names meaning "pleasant hill"
- Region of origin: England

Other names
- Variant form: Merril
- Related names: Merle, Muriel

Merrill is a unisex given name of English origin.

== Men ==
- Merrill Aldrich (1899–1957), American politician
- Merrill Bradshaw (1929–2000), American composer
- Merrill Cook (born 1946), American politician and businessman
- Merrill Douglas (born 1936), American football player
- Merrill J. Fernando (1930–2023), Sri Lankan businessman and founder of Dilmah tea
- Merrill Jensen (1905–1980), American historian
- Merrill Kelly (born 1988), American baseball player
- Merrill Moses (born 1977), Olympic water polo player
- Merrill Piepkorn (born 1949), American politician
- Merrill Reese (born 1942), American sports radio announcer
- Merrill Sanford (born 1947), American politician
- Merrill G. Wheelock (1822–1866), American architect

== Women ==
- Merrill Ashley (born 1950), American ballet dancer and répétiteur
- Merrill Elam, American architect and educator
- Merrill Garbus (born 1979), musician behind the experimental indie project Tune-yards
- Merrill Joan Gerber (born 1938), American writer
- Merrill Markoe (born 1948), American author
- Merrill Nisker (born 1966), Canadian electroclash musician and producer
- Merrill Swain, Canadian applied lindquist

== See also ==
- Merrill (surname)
- Merrill (disambiguation)
- Merril
