= Merle (given name) =

Unisex given name

- Pronunciation: US: /ˈmɜːrl/ UK: /ˈmɜːl/
- Gender: Unisex
- Language: English

Origin
- Languages: 1. Latin; 2. French; 3. English
- Origin: From the English word merle or the French surname Merle
- Derivation: Latin: merula
- Meaning: "Blackbird"
- Region of origin: France and England

Other names
- Variant form: Merl
- Related names: Merrill, Muriel

Merle is a given name used by both men and women, from the English word merle or the French surname Merle, which both meaning blackbird (from the Latin merula). Related names are Merrill or Muriel.

== People ==
=== Female ===
- Merle Barwis (1900–2014), American-Canadian supercentenarian
- Merle van Benthem (born 1992), Dutch cyclist
- Merle Chambers (born 1946), American business executive
- Merle Collins (born 1950), Grenadian poet and writer
- Merle Dandridge (born 1975), American actress and singer
- Merle Egan Anderson (c. 1888–1984), American military servicewoman
- Merle Feld (1947), American author, playwright, poet and activist
- Merle S. Goldberg (1936–1998), American journalist and abortion rights activist
- Merle Goldman (1931–2023), American historian
- Merle Greene Robertson (1913–2011), American artist, art historian and archaeologist
- Merle Greenwood (1900–1990), Australian-born New Zealand architect
- Merle Hodge (born 1944), Trinidadian novelist
- Merle Hoffman (born 1946), American journalist and activist
- Merle Jääger (born 1965), Estonian actress and poet
- Merle Karusoo (born 1944), Estonian stage director and writer
- Merle Keagle (1923–1960), American baseball player
- Merle G. Kearns (1938–2014), American politician
- Merle Kivimets (born 1974), Estonian track and field athlete
- Merle Krigul (born 1954), Estonian philologist and politician
- Merle Liivand (born 1991), Estonian swimmer and environmental activist
- Merle Louise (1934–2025), American Broadway actress
- Merle Oberon (1911–1979), Indo-English actress
- Merle Palmiste (born 1970), Estonian actress
- Merle Park (born 1937), British prima ballerina
- Merle Parts (born 1967), Estonian judge
- Merle Richardson (born 1930), Australian lawn bowls player
- Merle Soppela (born 1991), Finnish alpine ski racer
- Merle Talvik (born 1954), Estonian actress
- Merle Temkin (born 1937), American artist
- Merle Tottenham (1901–1958), English film actress
- Merle Viirmaa (born 1974), Estonian biathlete
- Merle Woo (born 1941), American academic and activist

=== Male ===
- Merle Allin (born 1955), American punk rock musician
- Merle Anthony (1926–1993), American baseball umpire
- Merle Battiste (1933–2009), American chemist
- Merle Bettenhausen (1943–2026), American race car driver
- Merle Boucher (born 1946), American politician
- Merle Boyer (1920–2009), American jewelry designer
- Merle Curti (1897–1997), American historian and Pulitzer Prize winner
- Merle Dickerson (1911/12–1984), Canadian politician
- Merle Evans (1891–1987), American cornet player and circus bandleader
- Merle Fainsod (1907–1972), American political scientist
- Merle Flowers (born 1968), American politician
- Merle Gulick (1906–1976), American football player
- Merle Haggard (1937–2016), American country-western musician
- Merle Hansen (1919–2009), American farm activist
- Merle Harmon (1926–2009), American sportscaster
- Merle Hay (1896–1917), American Army soldier, first American soldier killed in World War I
- Merle J. Isaac (1898–1996), American composer
- Merle Kilgore (1934–2005), American singer, songwriter and manager
- Merle Lawrence (1915–2007), American physiologist
- Merle Randall (1888–1950), American physical chemist
- Merle Robbins (c. 1912–1984), businessman, inventor of the card game UNO
- Merle Sande (1939–2007), American physician
- Merle Schlosser (1923–1993), American football player and coach
- Merle Settlemire (1903–1988), American baseball player
- Merle Shain (1935–1989), Canadian author and journalist
- Merle Taylor (1927–1987), American bluegrass musician
- Merle Travis (1917–1983), American country music singer
- Merle Tuve (1901–1982), American geophysicist
- Merle Watson (1945–1985), American folk musician
- Merle Leland Youngs (1886–1958), American businessman

== Fictional characters ==
- Merle Dixon, in AMC's TV series The Walking Dead
- Merle, a character in The Vision of Escaflowne, a 1996 anime series
