= Mounir Moufarrige =

Mounir Moufarrige is a brand developer and creator. Best known for shifting Alfred Dunhill from a smokers to a life style brand, reviving Montblanc 'making the pen a cult object of desire', hiring Stella McCartney at Chloé, and helping to turn the historic Goyard brand into a global commercial success. He is also noted for spotting the future trend of larger sized watches in Panerai. He started his career in luxury fashion and lifestyle in 1988, after 3 years of training as a sales promotion rep at Rothmans International,

== Biography ==
Mounir Mouffarige studied law in Lebanon.

In 1980, he became Alfred Dunhill's (part of the Richemont group) rep for Africa and the Middle East. In 1985, he became Chief Executive of the product divisions and turned the company over from tobacco and lighters to tailoring, leather and watches. He worked a similar scale transformation with Montblanc (also part of the Richmont group), focusing solely on the development of the Meisterstuck pen, pulling the brand's 300 or so other pen models to do so. In 1997, he took over the management of Chloé (also part of the Richmont group) where he replaced Karl Lagerfeld with the then 24-year-old British designer Stella McCartney. He also spotted the talent of Phoebe Philo, then just 23 years old as McCartney’s first assistant, who subsequently succeeded McCartney as head designer at Chloé 5 years later.

In 2002, he founded France Luxury Group with François Barthes (EK Finances), which owned the labels Jean Louis Scherrer, Jacques Fath, Emmanuelle Khanh and Harel. In November 2002, he and Barthes sold their majority stake in the company to financier Alain Dumenil (owner of Francesco Smalto). In 2003, he took over the management of fragrance company Charles Frederick Worth, and hired the creative director Giovanni Bedin to successfully create a line of lingerie to attract a younger cientele. In 2003, he joined Goyard to modernize the centennial trunk brand. Having previously spotted the potential larger size watches in Officine Panerai while at Richemont, in 2005 Moufarrige joined forces with Italo Fontana, the creator of the U-Boat.

Simultaneously, whilst still actively working on U-BOAT watches and Goyard, Moufarrige became president and chief executive officer at Emanuel Ungaro in 2006 where he stayed until 2009 presiding over the development of the declining momentum of the historic Italian label, hiring actress Lindsay Lohan as artistic advisor to the creative director Estrella Archs. Mounir left Ungaro in December 2009. Bringing Lohan into the creative team was considered a mistake as the brand failed to rejuvenate its collection. He had supposedly got the green light from Anna Wintour to hire Lohan, which Wintour denied. He was also criticized for meddling with the creative staff's work, even though his responsibilities as CEO did not include creative work. Two top designers, George Cortina and Emanuel Ungaro quit Ungaro in 2007. After resigning from Ungaro in 2009, Moufarrige blamed his creative director Estrella Archs for the failure of Ungaro's popularity reboot.

Having recently joined S.T. Dupont as Vice Chairman of The Supervisory board in 2009, Mounir has been leading the push to bring its history back to life, repositioning the brand toward a younger and more fashion-orientated consumer and expanding into new product categories, including women’s leather goods in 2011. In 2018, he led S.T. Dupont's forray into the watch market.

Mounir remains President at U-Boat. On January 31, 2014, took a minority stake in Franco-Lebanese designer Christina Debs Jewelry line, with a view to expanding it internationally.

Also in 2014, after 5 years of research, Mounir Moufarrige acquired one of the oldest British watch brand names: L.KENDALL, LONDON 1742. Larcum Kendall is recognised for his major contributions in accurately pinpointing longitude position at sea. Together with designer Italo Fontana, the brand was presented at the 2014 Basle Watch Fair.
