= Merrill =

Merrill may refer to:

== Places in the United States ==
- Merrill Field, Anchorage, Alaska
- Merrill, Iowa
- Merrill, Maine
- Merrill, Michigan
- Merrill, Mississippi, an unincorporated community near Lucedale in George County
- Merrill, Oregon
- Merrill, Wisconsin
- Merrill (town), Wisconsin
- Merrill Township, Michigan
- Merrill Township, North Dakota
- Merrill College at the University of California, Santa Cruz

== People ==
- Merrill (given name)
- Merrill (surname)

== Other uses ==
- Merrill (company), a division of Bank of America
- Skidmore, Owings and Merrill, architectural firm
- USS Merrill (DD-976)
- Nine men's morris, a strategy board game also called Merrills
- Merrill (crater)
- Merrill, a companion character in Dragon Age II

== See also ==
- Marill, a Pokémon
- Meril, Bangladeshi brand of personal care products
- Merrell (disambiguation)
- Merril
- Meryl
