= Lilac Bush in the Sun =

Painting by Claude Monet

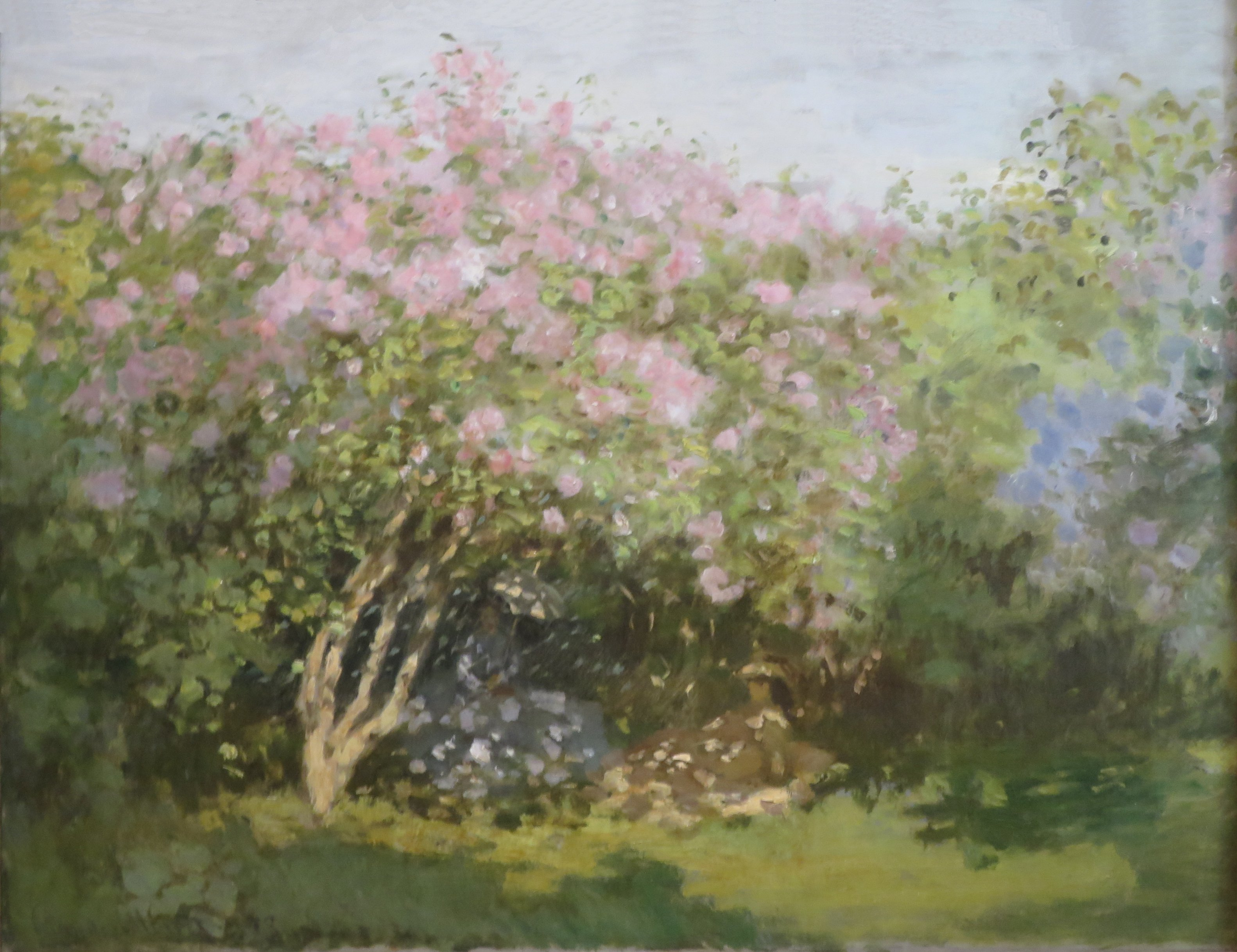
Lilac Bush in the Sun (1873) by Claude Monet

Lilac Bush in the Sun is an oil on canvas painting by Claude Monet, from 1873. It is held in the Pushkin Museum, in Moscow. It is a pendant to the same artist's Resting Under a Lilac Bush (Musée d'Orsay, Paris).

It was exhibited at Paul Durand-Ruel's gallery until 1877 and then again in 1891. It was bought by Dmitry Schukin in 1899 - his collection was seized by the state after the October Revolution and the work was initially assigned to the First Museum of Old Western Painting before being transferred to the new Pushkin Museum in 1924, where it remains.

== See also ==
- List of paintings by Claude Monet
