= Merl =

Merl or MERL may refer to:

== Merl ==
- Merl (name), a list of people with the given name or surname
- Merl, Luxembourg, a quarter of Luxembourg City
- Merl (Buffyverse), a fictional character in the television series Angel

== MERL ==
- Mechanical Engineering Research Laboratory, near Glasgow, Scotland, original name of the National Engineering Laboratory
- Mitsubishi Electric Research Laboratories, Cambridge, Massachusetts, United States
- Museum of English Rural Life, Reading, Berkshire, England

== See also ==
- Common blackbird, merl in Scottish English
- Merle (disambiguation)
- Merlin (disambiguation)
