= Merrell =

Merrell may refer to:

- Merrell (company), an American footwear maker
- Merrell Tavern, a historic tavern in South Lee, Massachusetts, USA
- Merrell Dow Pharmaceuticals, former U.S. pharmaceutical company

== People ==
- Barry Merrell (born 1945), Canadian professional ice hockey player
- Billy Merrell (born 1982), American author and poet
- James Merrell (born 1953), American historian and college professor
- John Porter Merrell (1846–1916), American admiral
- Joseph F. Merrell (1926–1945), American soldier and Medal of Honor recipient
- Merrell Fankhauser (born 1943), American singer, songwriter, and guitarist
- Merrell Jackson (1952–1991), American actor
- Merrell Twins (born 1996), Veronica and Vanessa Merrell, identical twin American YouTubers, actresses, producers, musicians, singers and songwriters

== See also ==
- Merel, name
- Concordia Merrel (1885–1962), British actress and author
- Merrill (disambiguation)
