= Merle (surname) =

Merle is a surname. Notable people with the surname include:

- Carole Merle (born 1964), French former alpine skier
- Foulques du Merle (died 1314), Marshal of France
- Frank Merle (mathematician) (born 1962), French mathematician
- Georges Merle (1851–1886), French painter
- Guy du Merle (1908–1993), French aeronautical engineer, test pilot and writer
- Hugues Merle (1823–1881), French painter; father of Georges Merle
- Leo Merle (born 1998), American Paralympic athlete
- Matthieu Merle (c. 1548 – after 1587), Huguenot captain in the Wars of Religion
- Natasha C. Merle (born 1983), American lawyer and judge
- Olivier Merle (born 1965), French former rugby union footballer
- Pierre Hugues Victoire Merle (1766–1830), French general of the Napoleonic Wars
- Robert Merle (1908–2004), French novelist
