= Herrell =

Herrell is a surname. Notable people with the surname include:

- Jamie Herrell (born 1994), Filipnio-American actress and beauty queen
- Ron Herrell (born 1948), American politician
- Walt Herrell (1889–1949), American baseball player
- Yvette Herrell (born 1964), American politician

== See also ==
- Herrell's Ice Cream, chain of ice cream stores
