= Resting Under a Lilac Bush =

Painting by Claude Monet

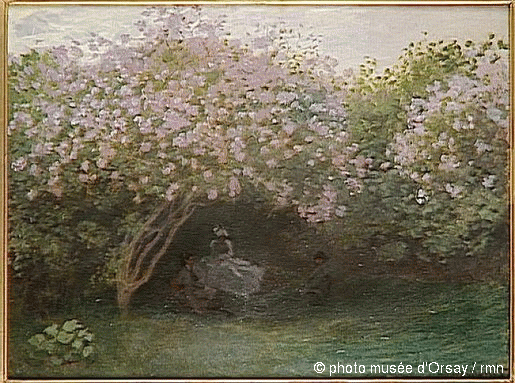
- Artist: Claude Monet
- Year: 1873
- Medium: oil on canvas
- Movement: Impressionism
- Dimensions: 50.2 cm × 65.2 cm (19.8 in × 25.7 in)
- Location: Musée d'Orsay; Paris

Resting Under a Lilac Bush or Lilac Bush, Grey Weather (French - Lilas, temps gris) is an oil on canvas painting by Claude Monet, from 1873. It is held in the Musée d'Orsay, in Paris. It is a pendant to Lilac Bush in the Sun (1873, Pushkin Museum, Moscow). Both works show Monet's garden in his first home in Argenteuil, a suburb of Paris.

== See also ==
- List of paintings by Claude Monet
