= Merril =

Merril is a given name and surname. Notable people with the name include:

- Judith Merril (1923–1997), American and Canadian science fiction writer
- Merril Anthony (1909–1967), Guyanese cricketer
- Merril Bainbridge (born 1968), Australian singer and songwriter
- Merril Hoge (born 1965), American football player
- Merril Jessop (1935–2022), American bishop
- Merril Sandoval (1925–2008), U.S. Marine, Navajo code talker

== See also ==
- Merrill (disambiguation)
- Merrill (surname)
- Merrill (given name)
