= Samuel Merrill =

Samuel Merrill may refer to:

- Samuel Merrill (Indiana politician) (1792–1855), early leading figure in Indiana
- Samuel Merrill (Iowa governor) (1822–1899), Republican Governor of Iowa from 1868 to 1872
- Samuel Merrill III (born 1939), political scientist and mathematician
- Sam Merrill (born 1996), NBA basketball player, currently of the Cleveland Cavaliers
- Samuel Ingham Merrill (1856–1932), California businessman and philanthropist
