= Herrell's Ice Cream =

Ice cream stores, New York and Massachusetts

Coordinates: 42°19′4.4″N 72°37′51.4″W

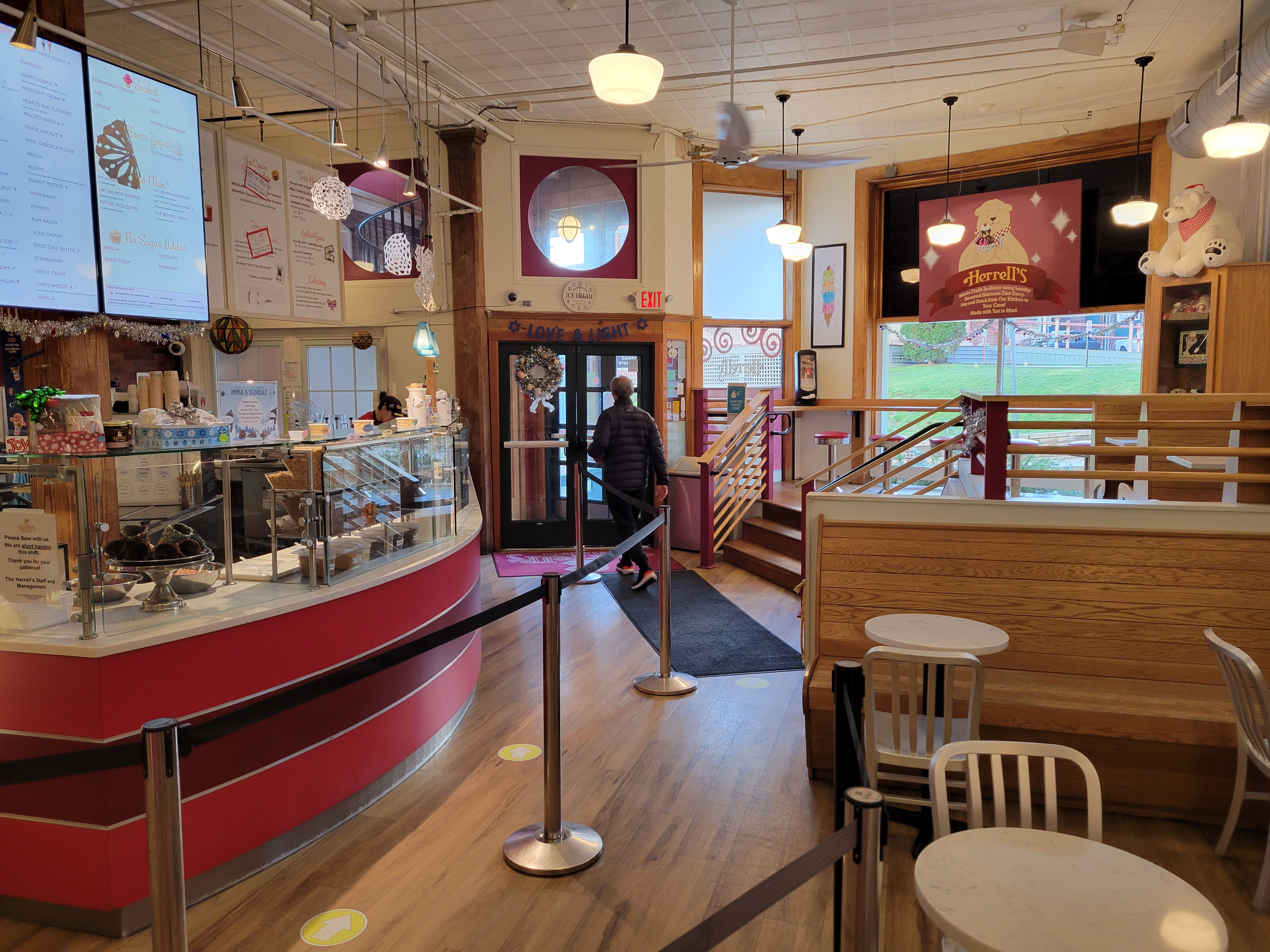
- Herrell's Ice Cream in Northampton, Massachusetts
- Type: Franchises, Wholesale (hot fudge)
- Industry: Frozen Food Industry
- Founded: 1980; 46 years ago; Northampton, Massachusetts
- Headquarters: Northampton, Massachusetts
- Area served: Stores in: Northeastern United States of America
- Products: Desserts, mainly ice cream
- Website: herrells.com

Herrell's Ice Cream is a chain of ice cream stores located in Massachusetts and New York, featuring over 400 homemade flavors.

== History ==
=== Steve's Ice Cream ===
Steve's Ice Cream was founded in 1973 in Somerville, Massachusetts by Steve Herrell. By mechanically altering a small batch commercial freezer, Herrell produced an extraordinarily rich, creamy, low-air ice cream. Herrell was introduced to the Heath candy bar by a friend in the late 1960s and felt that it would make an excellent addition to ice cream. When he opened his first store, instead of having pre-mixed flavors like chocolate chip, he had his staff mix freshly made ice cream with candy or other confections based upon customer requests. These candy additions later became known as mix-ins. The custom-blended flavors proved to be highly desired by customers, and Herrell sold out of ice cream on his first day open. The store became very popular in a short time.

Herrell sold his company to Joe Crugnale, the future founder of the Bertucci's restaurant chain, in 1977.

=== Herrell's Ice Cream ===
After selling Steve's Ice Cream, Herrell moved to Northampton, Massachusetts. The sale agreement included a three-year non-compete clause. After this expired in 1980, he opened Herrell's Ice Cream, bringing with him all of the original recipes and techniques he used at Steve's. As of 2024, Judy Herrell (Steve's ex-wife) owns and manages Herrell's Ice Cream.

== Stores ==
The flagship store and corporate headquarters is located in Northampton, Massachusetts. In 1982, a second store opened in Harvard Square in Cambridge, Massachusetts and is now closed. Another store at the Massachusetts Museum of Contemporary Art in North Adams, Massachusetts, opened in 1996. The newest store in Huntington, New York, opened in 2008. In the late summer of 2024 a new location opened up in the Mill District, Amherst, Massachusetts

In September 2009, the franchise owner of the Harvard Square location announced that he would close the ice cream parlor and replace it with a pub. This closure comes just months after another location in Allston, Massachusetts also closed, leaving only a handful of stores still open. In 2008 Herrell's was split into two businesses, Herrell's Development, which is run by Judy Herrell (Steve and Judy Herrell were divorced in 2000) which deals with franchisees, and Herrell's Ice Cream, run by Steve Herrell, which handles the store in Northampton. The Allston Herrell's closed after disputes with how the franchise business was being run; it became Allston Cafe, selling Coop's Ice Cream, Allston Cafe has since closed.

== Critical opinion ==
In 1998, USA Today named Herrell's #2 in the nation. Newsweek mentioned Herrell's "uncompromising quality" and called it "a mecca for ice cream lovers". In 2000, Julia Child called Herrell's ice cream "delicious".
