= John Merrill =

John Merrill may refer to:

- John Merrill (marathon walker), British sportsman
- John Merrill (Medal of Honor) (1843–1883), awarded the U.S. Medal of Honor, 1879
- John Merrill (American politician) (born 1963), American politician from Alabama
- John O. Merrill (1896–1975), American architect and structural engineer
- John P. Merrill (1917–1984), American physician, researcher and Harvard professor
- John C. Merrill, American professor
- John Merrill (MP) (died 1734), British government official and politician

== See also ==
- Jon Merrill (disambiguation)
