= Georges Merle =

French painter (1851–1886)

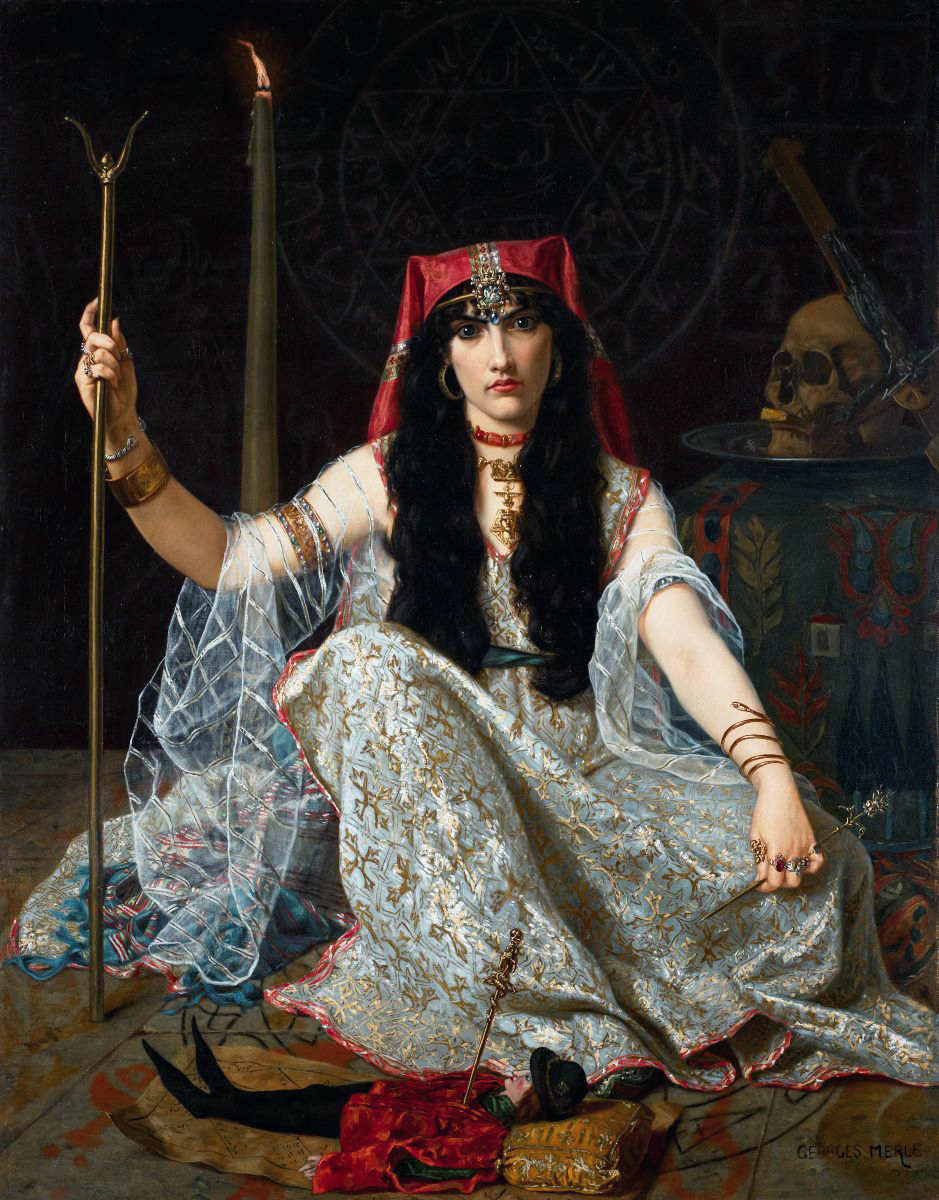
L'Envoûteuse (The Sorceress), oil on canvas, Georges Merle, 1883. Birmingham Museum of Art

Georges Merle (1851–1886) was a French painter known for his outstanding command of the female form. He often submitted works to the Salon in Paris.

His father, Hugues Merle, was also a painter. As Georges rarely signed his early pieces, several of his early works were at first mistakenly attributed to his father.
