= Hugues Merle =

French painter (1822–1882)

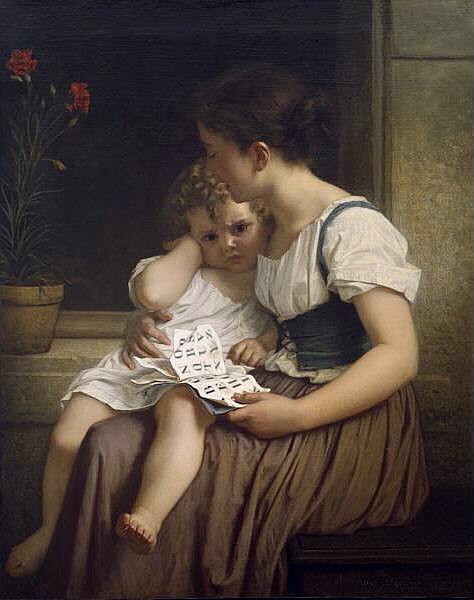
- The First Thorns of Knowledge (Les premières épines de la science), 1864, Dallas Museum of Art
- Born: April 28, 1822; La Sône, France
- Died: 1881 (aged 58–59); Paris, France
- Known for: Painting
- Children: Georges Merle

Hugues Merle (1822–1881) was a French painter who mostly depicted sentimental or moral subjects. He has often been compared to William-Adolphe Bouguereau.

== Biography ==
Hugues Merle was born in 1822 in La Sône. He studied painting with Léon Cogniet. Merle started exhibiting at the Salon (Paris) in 1847. He received second class prizes in 1861 and 1863. In 1866 he was made Chevalier of the Legion of Honor.

Hugues Merle became a friend of Paul Durand-Ruel in the early 1860s. Durand-Ruel had started buying paintings by Merle in 1862 and introduced the artist to painter William-Adolphe Bouguereau. Merle was later often compared to Bouguereau and “became a considerable rival of Bouguereau in subject and treatment”. In the mid-1860s, Merle painted several portraits of Paul Durand-Ruel, his wife, and their son, John.

Hugues Merle died in 1881 in Paris. His son Georges Merle also became a painter.

== Influence ==
David Lynch and Mark Frost's Twin Peaks TV series character the Log Lady resembles Hugues Merle's painting The Lunatic of Étretat (1871).

== Gallery ==
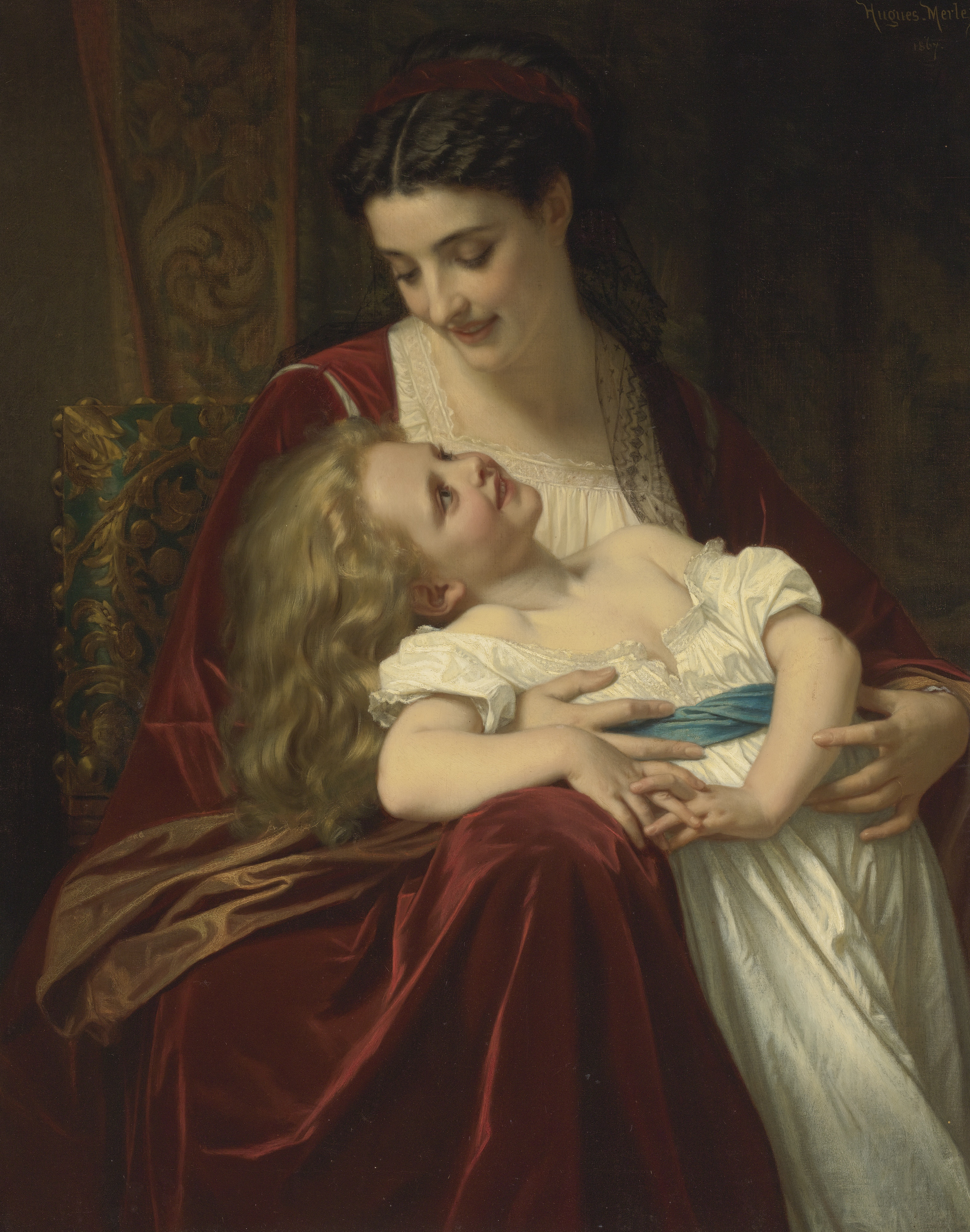
Maternal Affection

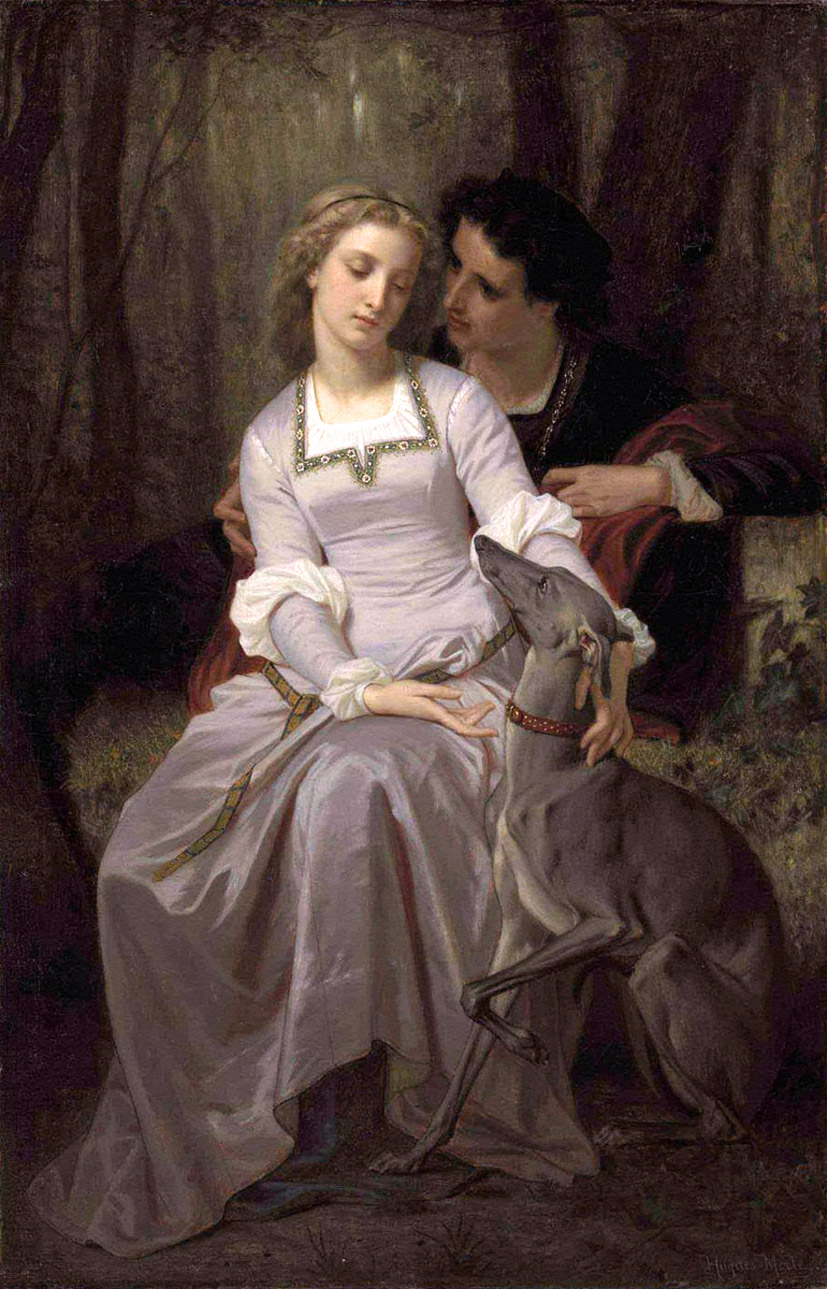
Tristan and Isolde

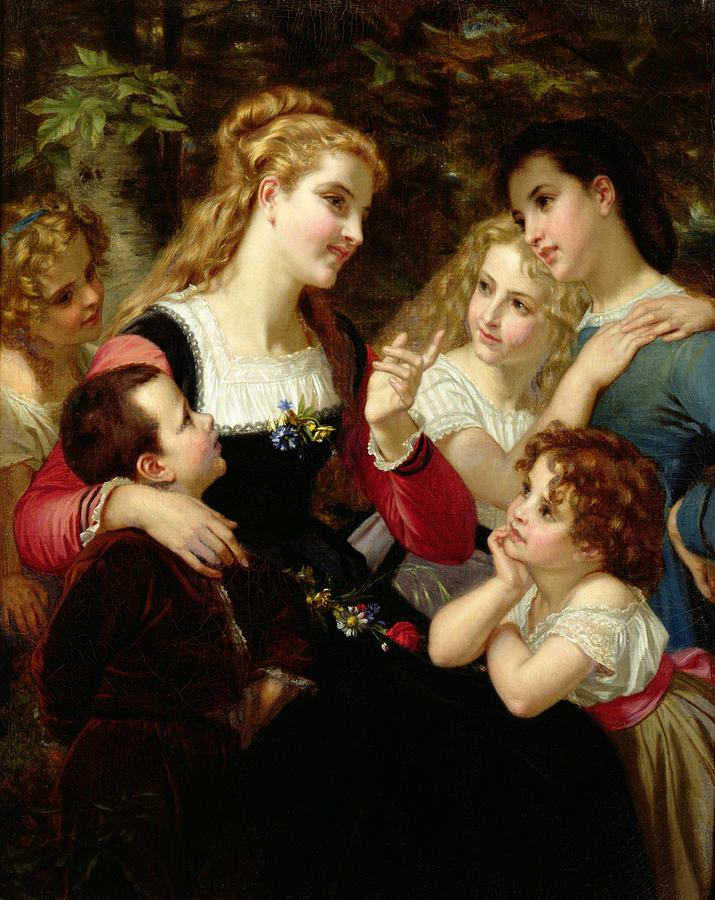
The Storyteller

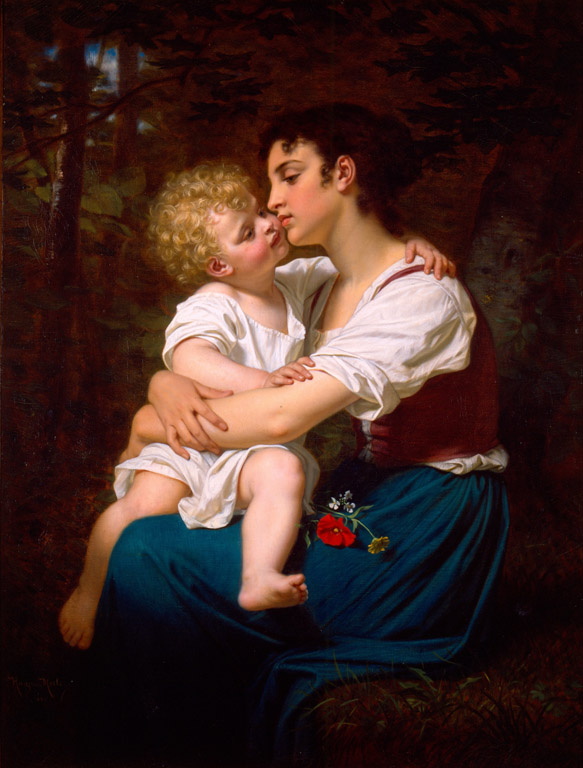
Maternal Love

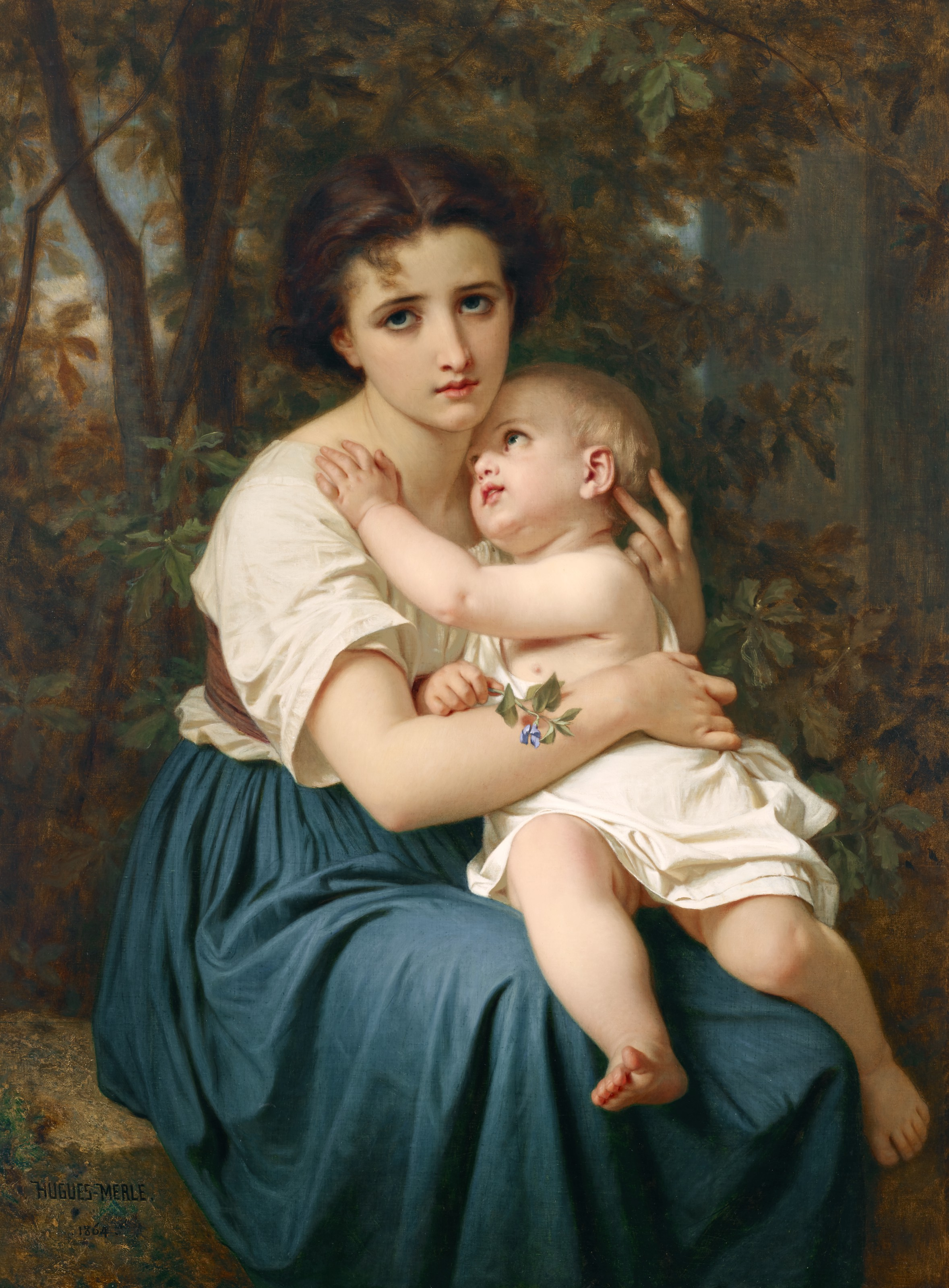
Thoughts of the Future

Romeo and Juliet

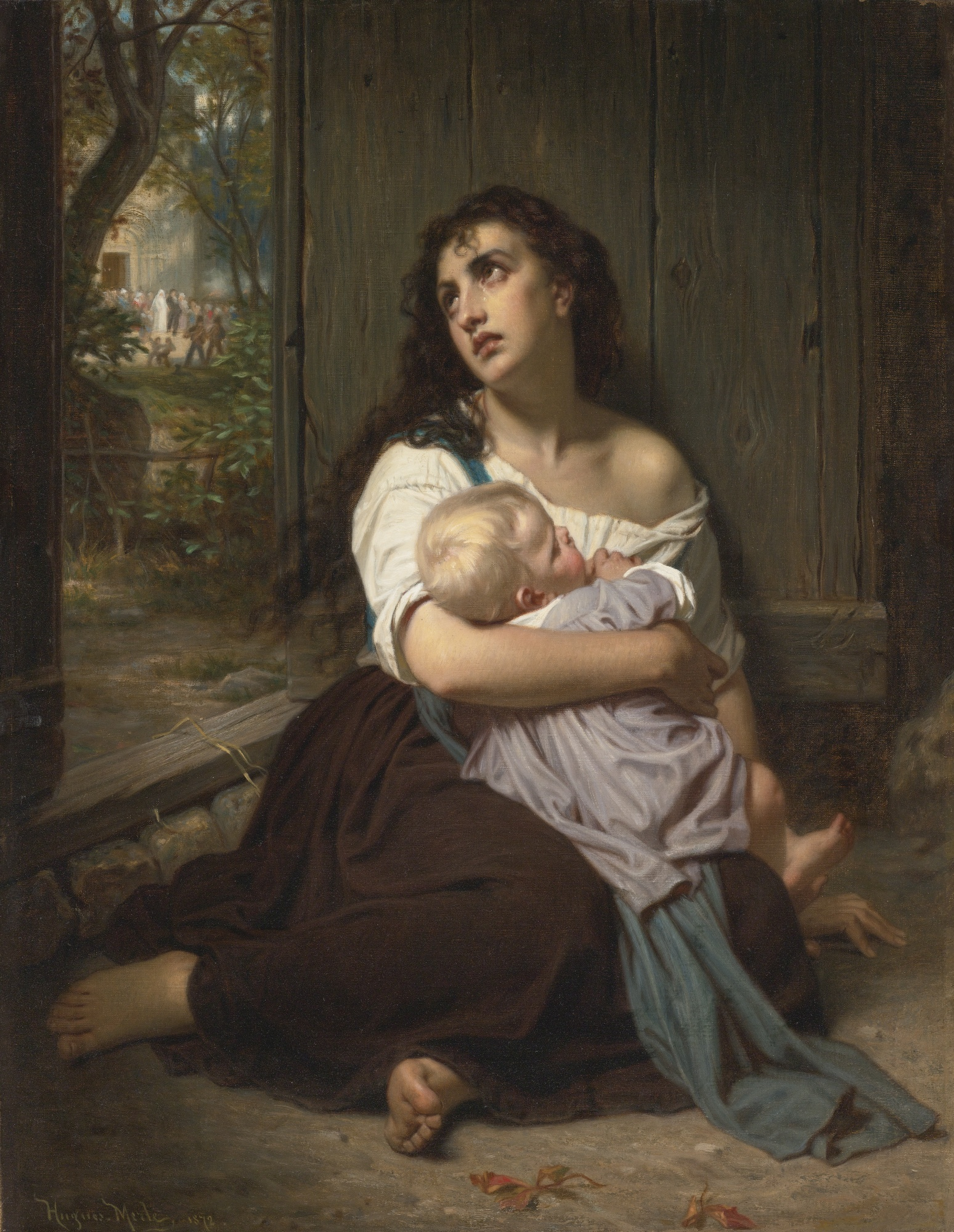
L'abandonnée, 1872

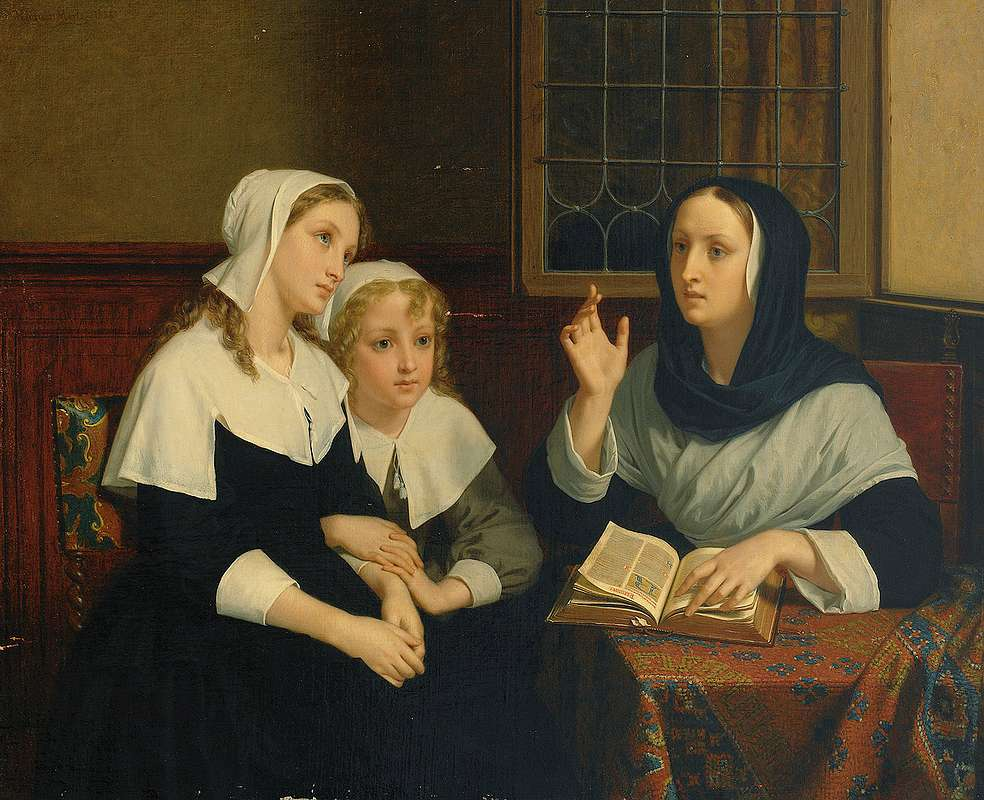
Les Orphelines

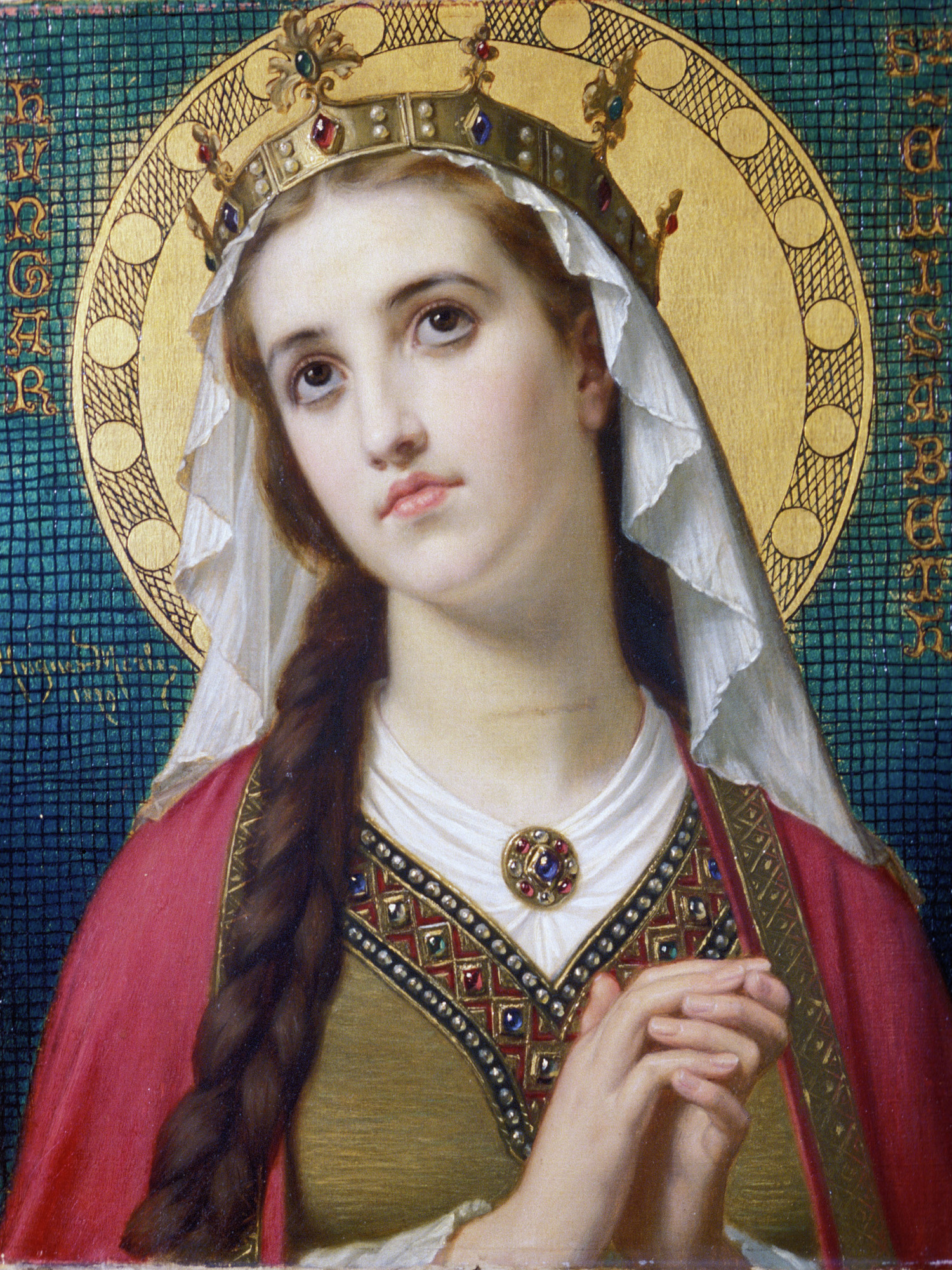
Saint Elizabeth of Hungary, 1879

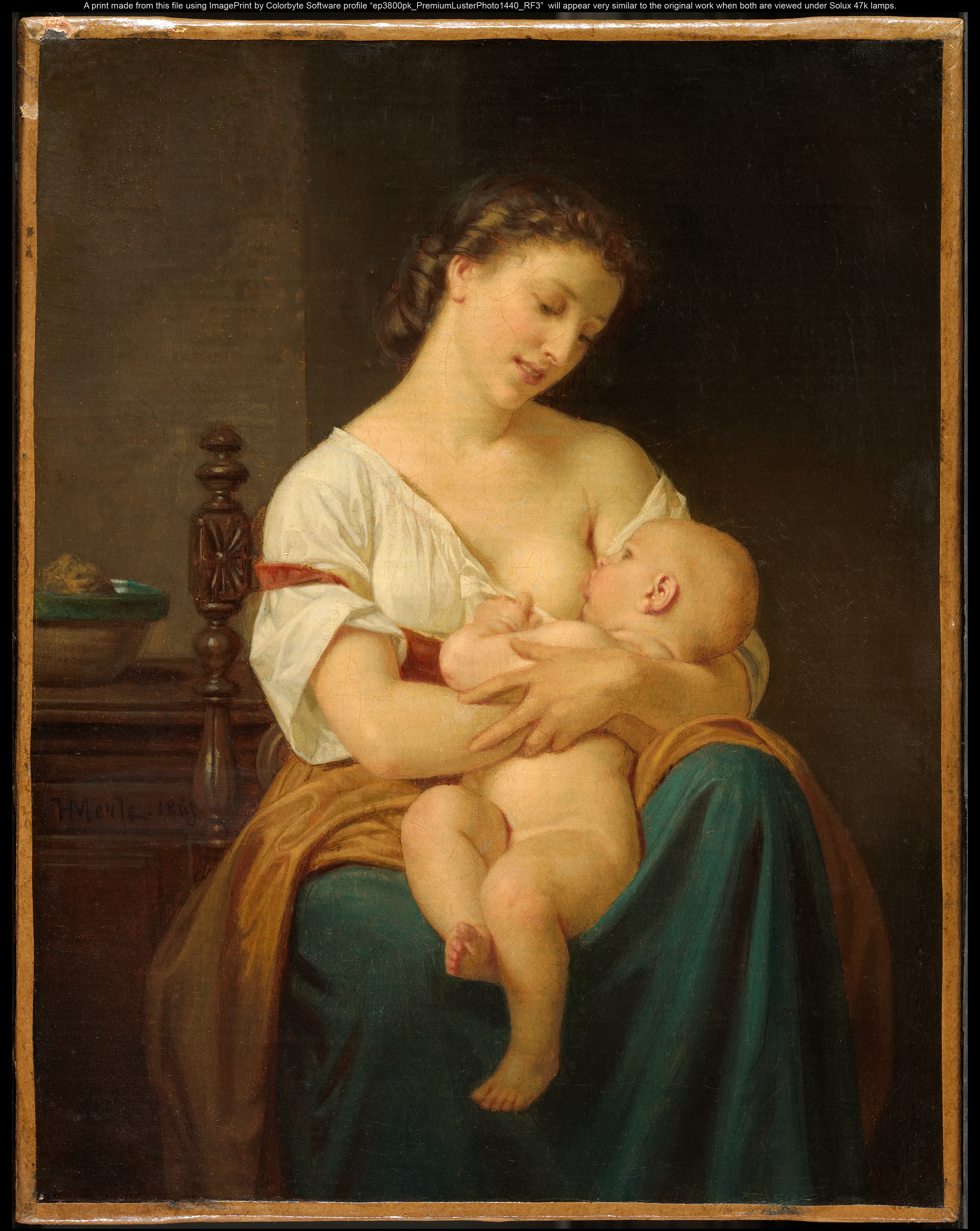
Mother and Child, c. 1869. Clark Art Institute

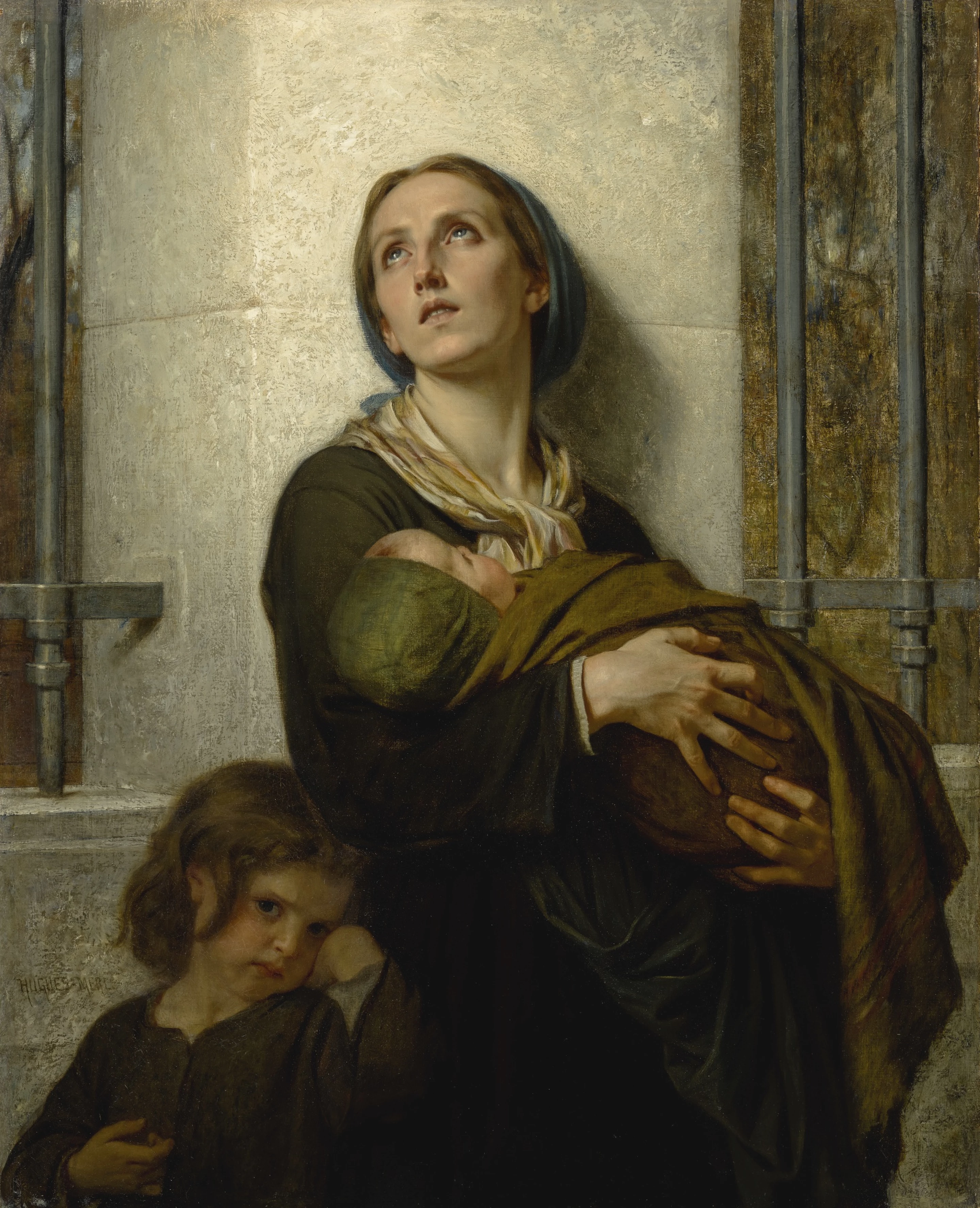
The Forgotten

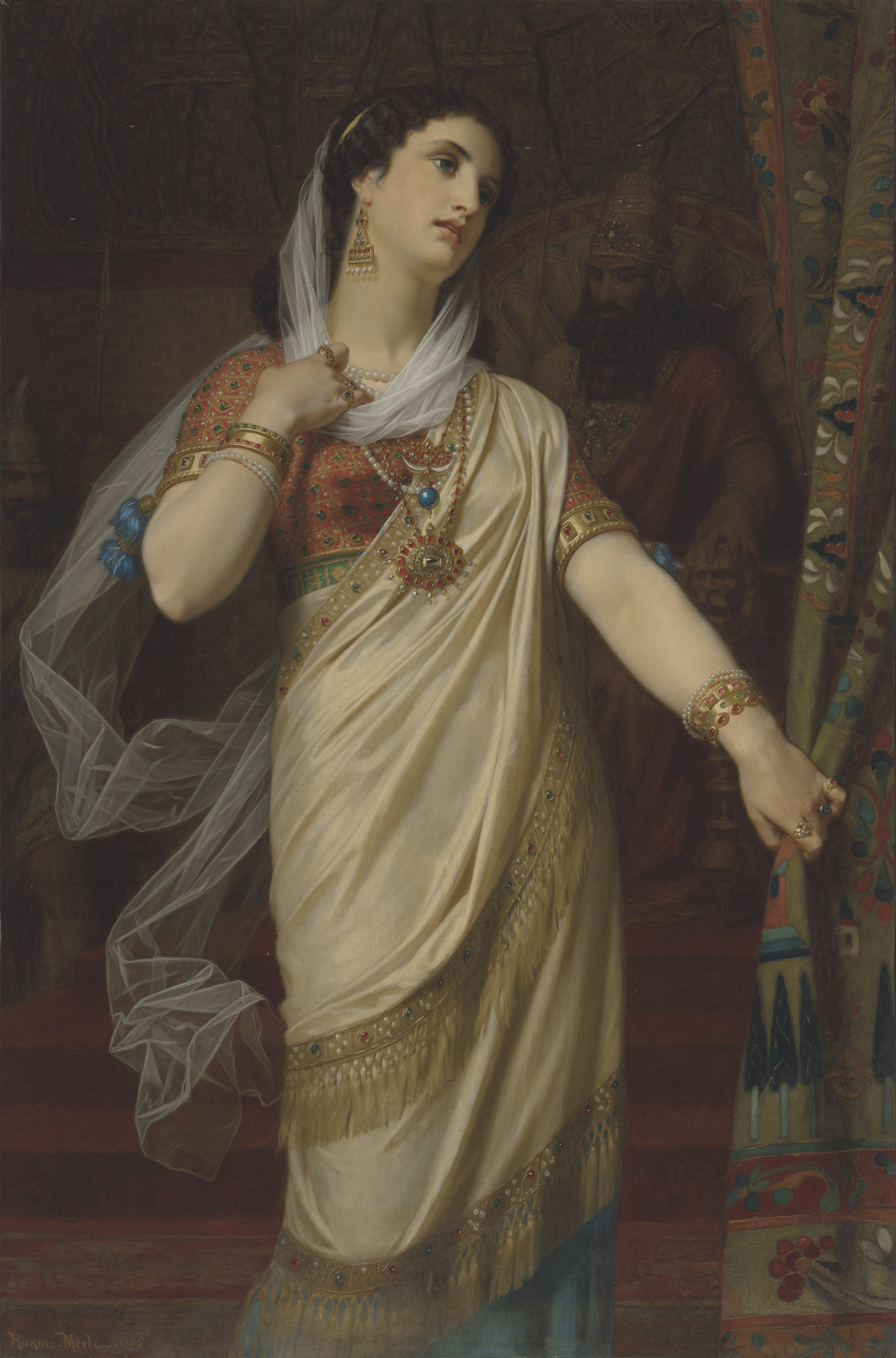
Esther

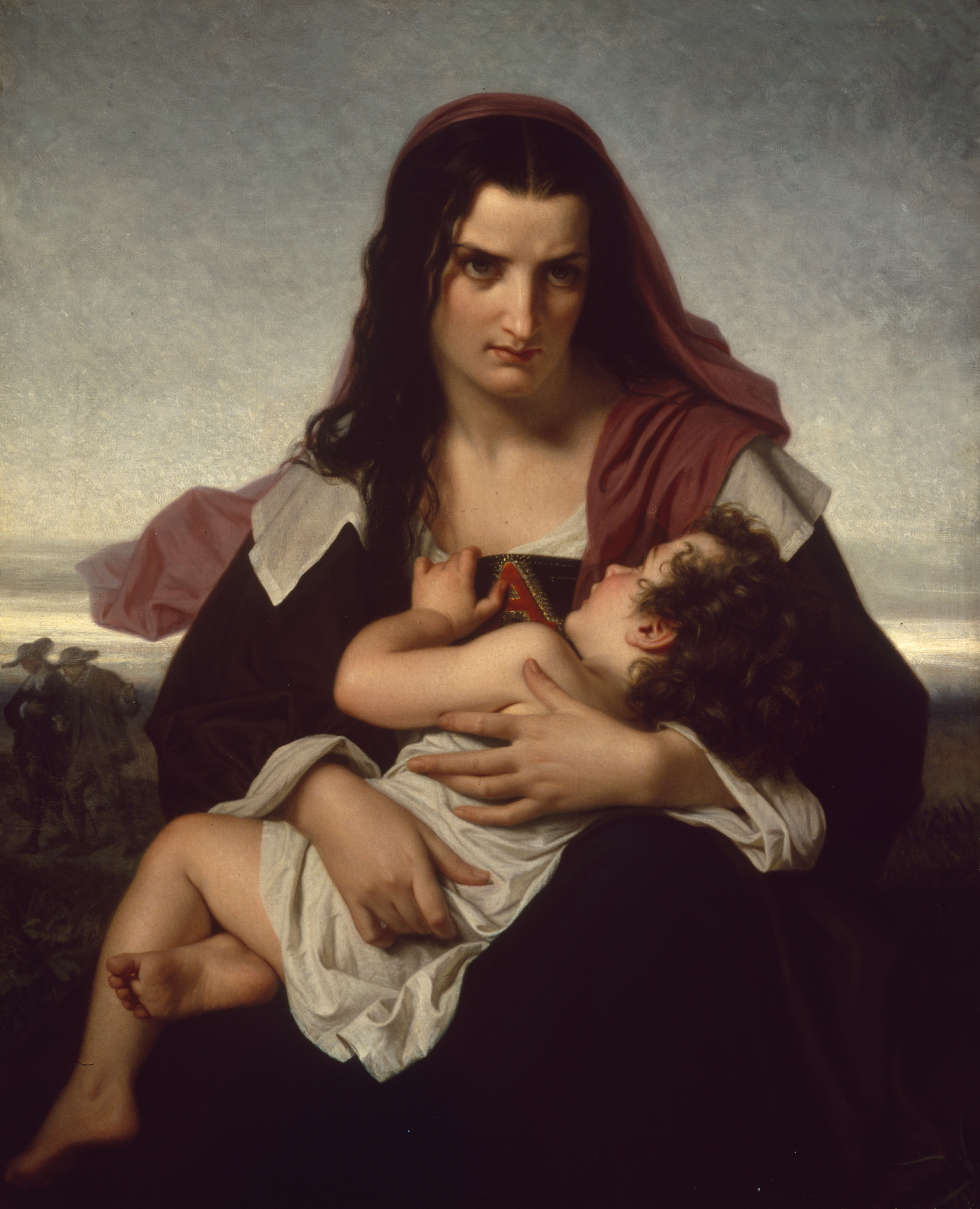
The Scarlet Letter, 1861

== Bibliography ==
- European Art in the High Museum, by Eric M. Zafran, Atlanta, 1984
- "Accounting for Tastes", by Linda Whiteley, Oxford Art Journal, Vol. 2, Art and Society (Apr., 1979), pp. 25–28

Media related to Hugues Merle at Wikimedia Commons
