= Muriel E. Platt =

American biochemist

- Platt, from the 1928 yearbook of Smith College
- Born: August 30, 1905; Tamaroa, Illinois, U.S.
- Died: July 12, 1953 (aged 47); Philadelphia, Pennsylvania, U.S.
- Other name: Muriel P. Munro
- Occupation: Biochemist

Muriel Estelle Platt Munro (August 30, 1905 – July 12, 1953) was an American biochemist and medical researcher, based in Philadelphia and Ontario.

== Biography ==
Platt was born in Tamaroa, Illinois, and raised in Hartford, Connecticut, the daughter of Benjamin Merchant Platt and Elizabeth Boardman Platt. Her father was a physician, born in England. Her parents were medical missionaries in the Philippines.

Platt attended Northfield Seminary and graduated from Smith College in 1928. She earned a master's degree in chemistry at McGill University in 1929, and completed doctoral studies in chemistry at McGill in 1932, with a dissertation titled "Cyclic Acetal Formation, the Ring-Partition Principle and Their Relation to the Structure of Carbohydrates", with adviser Harold Hibbert. She was a member of Phi Beta Kappa.

Platt worked in the department of hematology at Jefferson Medical College in Philadelphia, doing clinical research on blood chemistry and leukemia. Platt married a fellow biochemist, English-born Ferdinand Lutz Munro, in 1934. They joined a medical research foundation in Ontario in 1936. Her husband died in 1950, and she died in 1953, at the age of 47, in Philadelphia.

== Publications ==
Platt's work was published in scientific journals including Journal of the American Chemical Society, Canadian Journal of Research, Journal of Biological Chemistry, Journal of Clinical Investigation, American Journal of Physiology, and Biochemical Journal.

=== As Muriel E. Platt ===
- "Studies on Reactions Relating to Carbohydrates and Polysaccharides XXIV: Ring Migration in the Glycerol Cyclic Acetals; Behavior of Para-Nitrobenzylidene Glycerol" (1929, with Harold Hibbert and Neal M. Carter)
- "Studies on Reactions Relating to Carbohydrates and Polysaccharides XXV: Methylation Processes and Tendency Toward Ring Shift in Glycerol Cyclic Acetals" (1929, with Harold Hibbert and Neal M. Carter)
- "Studies on Reactions Relating to Carbohydrates and Polysaccharides XLIII: Cyclic Acetal and Ketal Formation from a-Phenyl Glycerol as further examples of the 'Ring Partition Principle'" (1932, with Harold Hibbert)
- "The Effect of Amines on Yeast Poisoned by Iodoacetic Acid" (1933, with E. F. Schroeder and Gladys E. Woodward)
- "The Relation of Sulfhydryl to Inhibition of Yeast Fermentation by Iodoacetic Acid" (1933, with E. F. Schroeder and Gladys E. Woodward)
- "Glyoxalase" (1934, with E. F. Schroeder)

=== As Muriel P. Munro ===
- "Glyoxalase" (1935, with Gladys E. Woodward, Leopold Weil, and E. F. Schroeder)
- "Some effects of pyrophosphate on the metabolism of tissues" (1939, with Margaret Elizabeth Greig)
- "The metabolism of lactic and pyruvic acids in normal and tumour tissues: Ox retina and chick embryo" (1939, with M. E. Greig and K. A. Elliott)
- "The Electrophoretic Properties of Globin from Various Species" (1943, with F. L. Munro)
- "The Changes in Components A and B of Prothrombin in the Dog Following Hepatectomy" (1945, with F. L. Munro, E. Ross Hart, and Adolph A. Walkling)
- "The Number and Relative Concentrations of Protein Constituents of Canine Pancreatic Juice as Determined by Electrophoresis" (1945, with J. E. Thomas)
- "The Influence of Hepatectomy on the Relative Concentrations of the Protein Components of Dog Plasma as Determined by Electrophoresis" (1946, with Annabel Avery)
- "Electrophoretic Isolation of a Circulating Anticoagulant" (1946, with F. L. Munro)
- "The Reversible Inactivation of Prothrombin: A Factor Responsible for its Partial Reactivation" (1947, with F. L. Munro)
- "The Interaction of Prothrombin A and B" (1947, with F. L. Munro)
- "Prothrombin determinations in dicumarolized patients; A comparison of the one-stage and bedside methods" (1950, with Daniel W. Lewis and F. L. Munro)
