= Samuel Ingham Merrill =

American businessman and philanthropist (1856-1932)

- Born: November 15, 1856; Buffalo, New York, United States
- Died: July 1932 (aged 75); California
- Occupation(s): Businessman and philanthropist
- Known for: Involvement in Christian benevolent work in California including founding the YMCA in Los Angeles
- Spouse: Sarah DeEtta Dearborn (m. 1888)
- Children: 3

Samuel Ingham Merrill (November 15, 1856 – July 1932) was a noted California businessman and philanthropist, known particularly for his involvement in Christian benevolent work. He is credited with founding the YMCA of Oakland, and later, the YMCA of Los Angeles in 1882, which celebrated its 125th anniversary in 2007.

== Early life and education ==
Merrill was born in Buffalo, New York, on November 15, 1856, son of Jerome Bonaparte Merrill and Jane Hughes. He was educated in the public schools of Buffalo and took employment with a Buffalo grain dealer.

Due to his younger brother's health issues, Merrill accompanied his brother and their mother to California for treatment, arriving in Oakland on September 11, 1876. In 1888, he married Sarah DeEtta Dearborn in East Oakland. They had three children: Grace Edith (Jensen), Charles Arthur, and Wallace Dearborn.

== Career ==
In 1876, Merrill began his own grocery business, but soon took employment with San Francisco bankers and brokers, Haley and Hopkins, becoming manager in 1878, and later becoming an officer in several corporations owned by Mark Hopkins.

=== Move to Southern California ===
In late 1881, Merrill moved his business interests to Los Angeles, forming first the Merrill and Babcock Hardware company, then the Percival and Merrill Iron Company. In 1885 he bought out a book and stationery business calling it Merrill and Cook, which became the largest business selling school supplies in Southern California. In 1891, Merrill sold out to Cook and entered the oil and gas business. In the following ten years, the Merrill Oil Company is said to have been probably the largest business of its kind in the world, with tank wagons serving thousands of customers in an estimated 20 towns and hamlets.

In 1901 he turned to iron and steel, organizing with other businessmen the California Industrial Company, capitalized at $2,500,000. Frederick Hastings Rindge served as president. Merrill served as director and general manager until becoming president in 1908. He was also a director of the Western Gas Engine Company. In 1908, he was one of five delegates from the L.A. Chamber of Commerce to visit Japan.

== Philanthropy ==
S.I. Merrill was heavily involved in Christian charities, helping to aid the poor and the homeless by providing both financial resources as well as direct involvement in leadership. He served as chairman of the board in the First Baptist Church and heading up its building committee.

Additionally, he helped found the Industrial Home Society for homeless boys between the ages of eight and thirteen, which later became the McKinley Boys Home, in honor of assassinated US President William McKinley. Today it is known as the McKinley Children's Center and is located in San Dimas.

In 1885 he helped found the Baptist College, and in 1896 together with Lyman Stewart, was involved in the founding of the Pacific Gospel Union, later known as the Union Rescue Mission.

He served on the board of directors of the Bible Institute of Los Angeles – known today as Biola University – along with T.C. Horton and Reuben Archer Torrey, former president of Moody Bible Institute.

During the Great Depression, S.I. Merrill lost much of his wealth, but remained strong in his Christian faith and committed to helping those in need. He is remembered for his tireless involvement in Christian causes intended to strengthen both body and soul.

== Death ==
In July 1932, Samuel Ingham Merrill was struck by a motorist while crossing a street in Los Angeles and died.
