= Merel =

Merel is a Dutch feminine given name, probably after the identical Dutch name for the blackbird (Turdus merula). It has also been used as a surname. Notable people with the name include:

Given name

- Merel de Blaeij (born 1986), Dutch field hockey player
- Merel Blom (born 1986), Dutch Olympic eventing rider
- Merel Baldé (despite not of Malian descent) (Dutch singer and actress)
- Merel van Dongen (born 1993), Dutch football midfielder, her middle name Didi is not really a popular Dutch name
- Merel de Knegt (born 1979), Dutch runner
- Merel Mooren (born 1982), Dutch volleyball player
- Merel Poloway (born 1946), American actress, wife of Raúl Juliá
- Merel S. Sager (1899–1982), American architect and landscape architect, male
- Merel Witteveen (born 1985), Dutch sailor
- Elmer (rapper), Dutch rapper Merel Pauw

Surname

- Loïc Merel (born 1965), French mathematician

== See also ==
- Concordia Merrel (1885–1962), British actress and author
- Merrell (disambiguation), include a list of people with the name Merrell
