= Paul Durand-Ruel =

French art dealer (1831–1922)

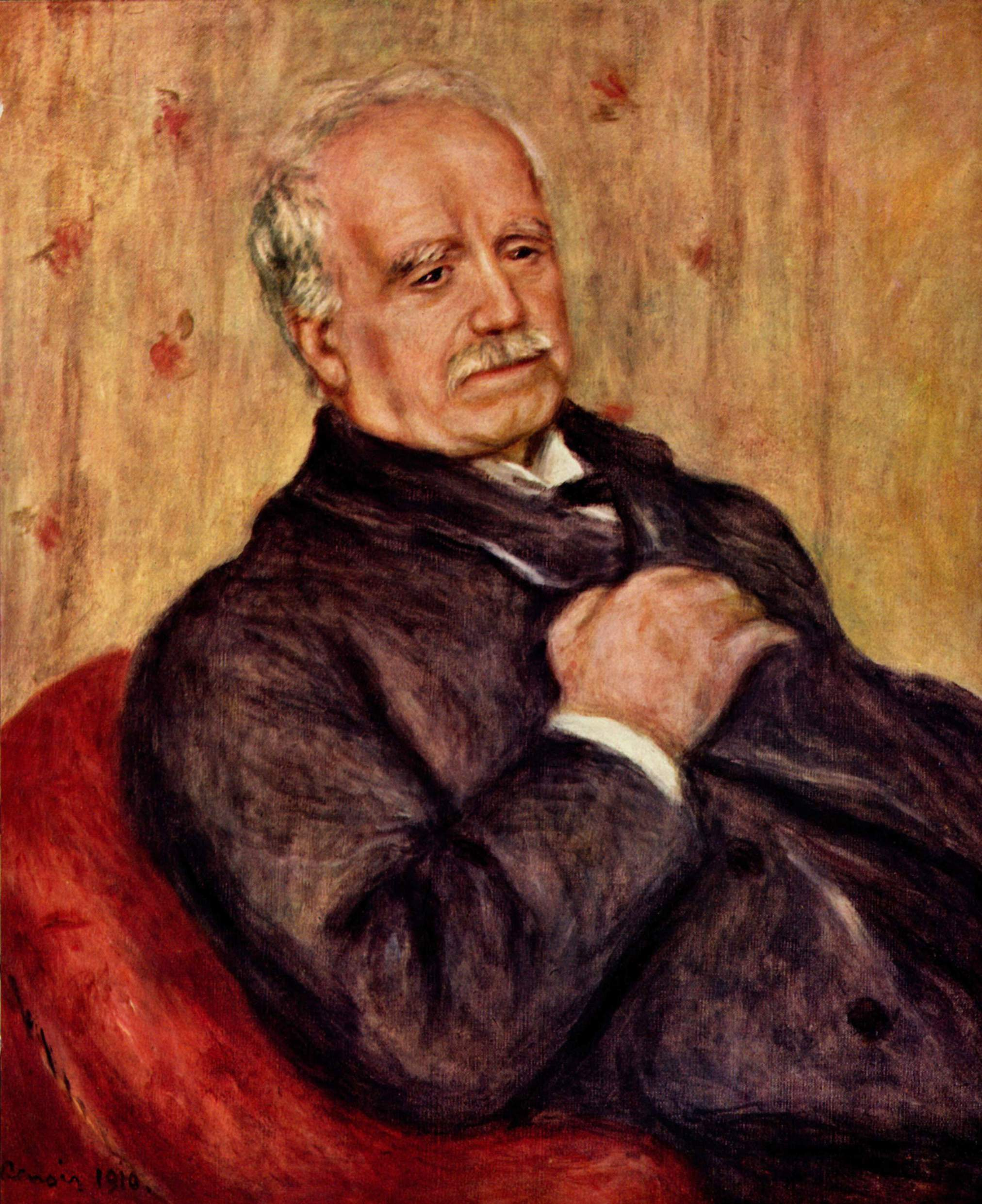
- Portrait by Pierre-Auguste Renoir, c. 1910
- Born: 31 October 1831; Paris, France
- Died: 5 February 1922 (aged 90); Paris, France
- Known for: Art dealing, Impressionist movement, modern art markets

Paul Durand-Ruel (French: [pɔl dyʁɑ̃ ʁɥɛl]; 31 October 1831 – 5 February 1922) was a French art dealer associated with the Impressionists and the Barbizon School. Being the first to support artists such as Claude Monet, Camille Pissarro, and Pierre-Auguste Renoir, he is known for his innovations in modernizing art markets, and is generally considered to be the most important art dealer of the 19th century. An ambitious entrepreneur, Durand-Ruel cultivated international interest in French artists by establishing art galleries and exhibitions in London, New York, Berlin, Brussels, among other places. Additionally, he played a role in the decentralization of art markets in France, which prior to the mid-19th century was monopolized by the Salon system.

== Early life and education ==
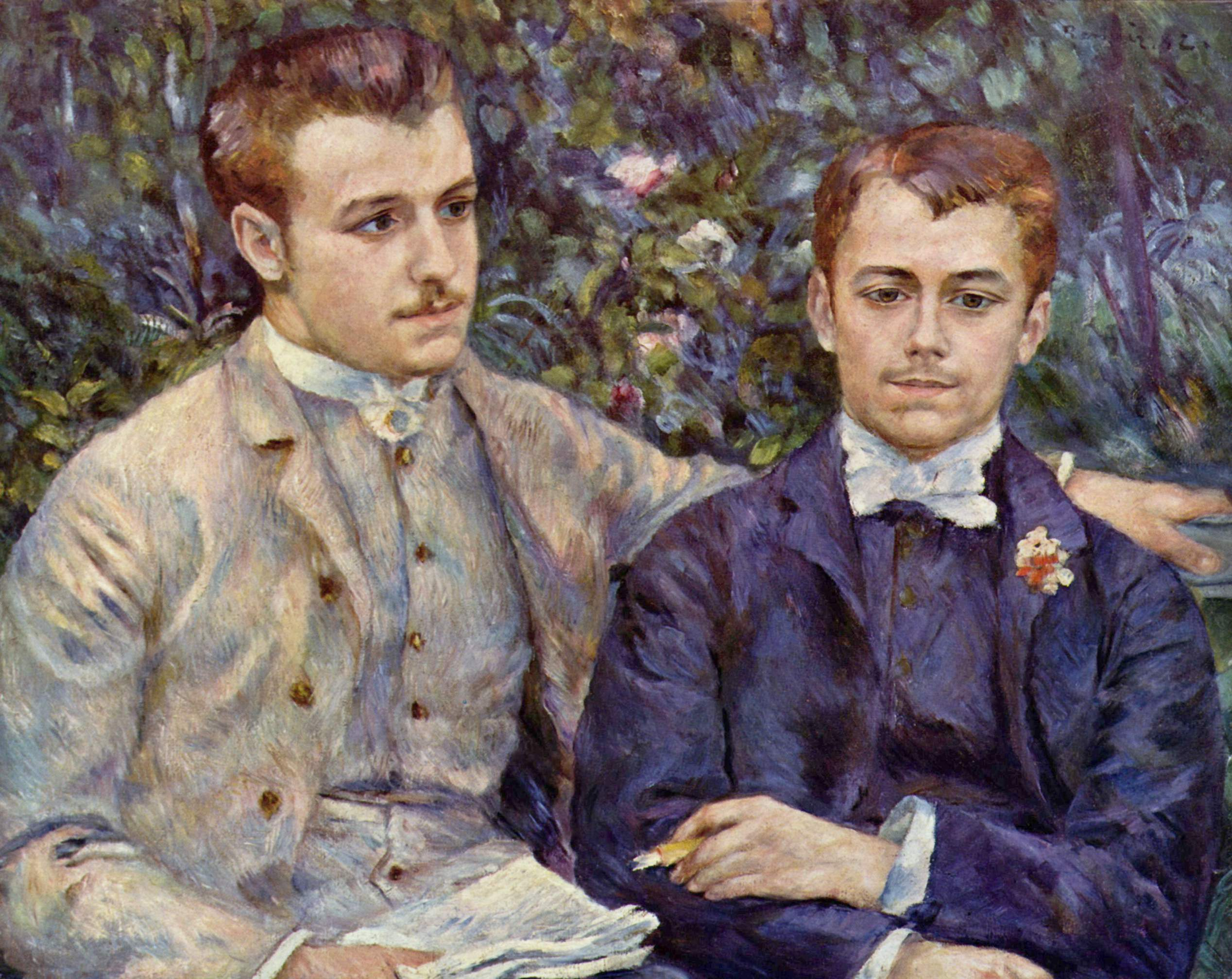
"The Brothers" (Charles and Georges Durand-Ruel) by Pierre Auguste Renoir (c. 1882)

He was born Paul-Marie-Joseph Durand-Ruel in Paris, son of Jean Marie Fortuné Durand and Marie Ferdinande Ruel. His parents, who opened an art shop in 1839, used the Durand-Ruel name for the family business. In 1851, Paul enrolled at the military school Ecole Militaire de Saint-Cyr but was forced to leave shortly after for health reasons. Paul Durand-Ruel married Jeanne Marie Eva Lafon in 1862; the couple's first child was born shortly thereafter.

== Career ==
In 1865, Paul took over the family business which represented artists such as Jean-Baptiste-Camille Corot and the members of the Barbizon school of French landscape painting. In 1867, he moved his gallery from 1 rue de la Paix, Paris, to 16 rue Laffitte, with a branch at 111 rue Le Peletier. During the 1860s and early 1870s, Durand-Ruel was an important advocate and successful art dealer of the Barbizon School but he is best known for his relationship with a group of painters who would become known as the Impressionists.

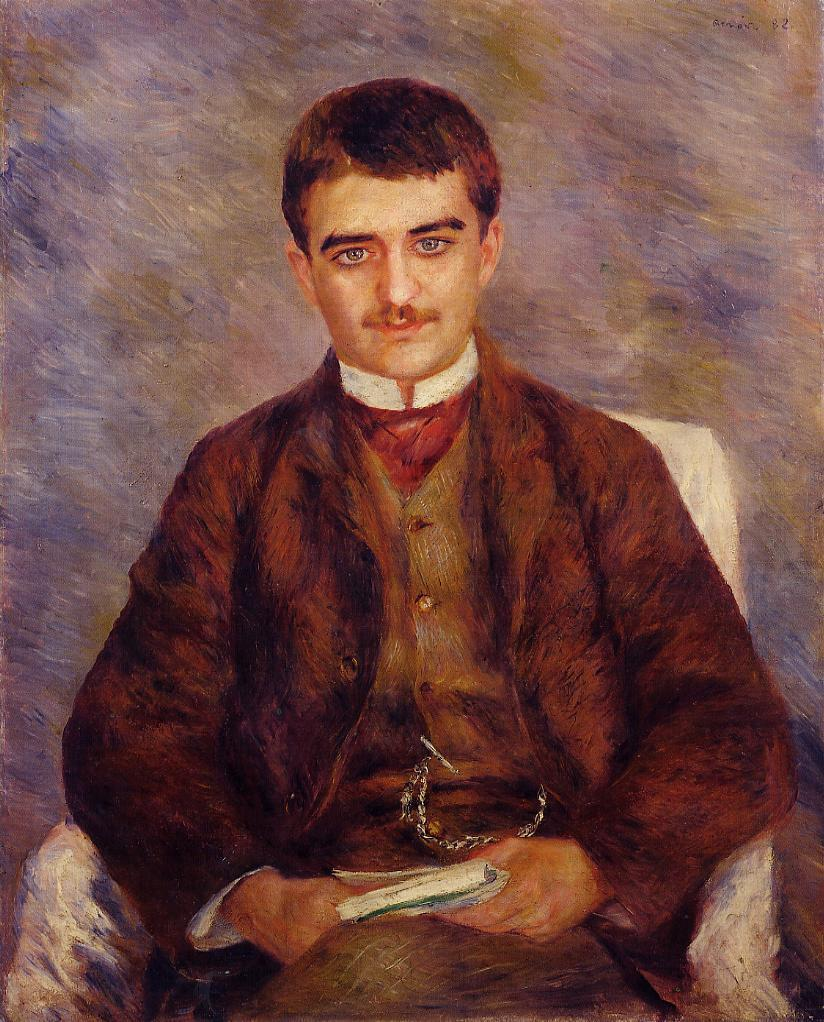
Portrait of Joseph Durand-Ruel by Pierre Auguste Renoir

He had three sons who worked with him in the business, Joseph Durand-Ruel (1862–1928), Charles Durand-Ruel (1865–1892), and Georges Durand-Ruel (1866–1931). After 1888 Joseph and his brothers began to take over the running of the family business from their father. They expanded into the American market, buying works by Eugène Delacroix, the Barbizon school and the Old Masters, and later by the Impressionists. But Charles is cited as having died in 1892.

The brothers held exhibitions of the work of Odilon Redon in 1894, Pierre Bonnard in 1896 and Paul Gauguin in 1903. In 1911 Joseph and Georges took over control of the business, specializing particularly in works by the Impressionists.

Joseph had a son he named Charles Durand-Ruel, who eventually took over the running of the Paris branch of the family firm.

=== The Salon System ===
Until the turn of the 20th century, the French 'Salon System' was the primary institution for exposing art to the public sphere. While the French Salon was an effective tool for funding and marketing new artists, it was completely centralized and relied on the state and the French Academy, making it difficult for artists to gain attention otherwise. The Impressionists were the first group of artists excluded from the Salon to successfully launch a series of art exhibitions outside of the state-sponsored system, and they did so with the assistance of Paul Durand-Ruel and other dealers. The exhibitions relied on a business model where artists would retain the proceeds from their own sales and the success of an exhibition relied upon the market demand for the art, rather than the reviews of the state. The emergence of the dealer-artists relationship and independent exhibitions beginning in the 1870s broke down the monopoly power of the Salon and began a new era of art markets.

=== La Belle École of 1830 ===
Prior to his support of the Impressionists, Durand-Ruel began his career in a campaign to raise the value of 'the beautiful School of 1830'. This group of artists were known for their work in Romanticism and landscape painting, and included Jean-Baptiste-Camille Corot, Théodore Rousseau, Jean-François Millet, Eugène Delacroix, and Gustave Courbet. Durand-Ruel played an active role in the collection of these painters' art in the 1860s and 70s. By 1874, having purchased 432 works by Delacroix, Corot, and Rousseau, Durand-Ruel was in a state of financial distress. It was during this time that Durand-Ruel developed seven innovative principles for supporting and increasing the value of art. Through organizing international exhibitions and curating an active public discourse around his art, Durand-Ruel's investment in La Belle École proved immensely profitable, and helped finance his later support for Impressionist artists.

=== Impressionism ===
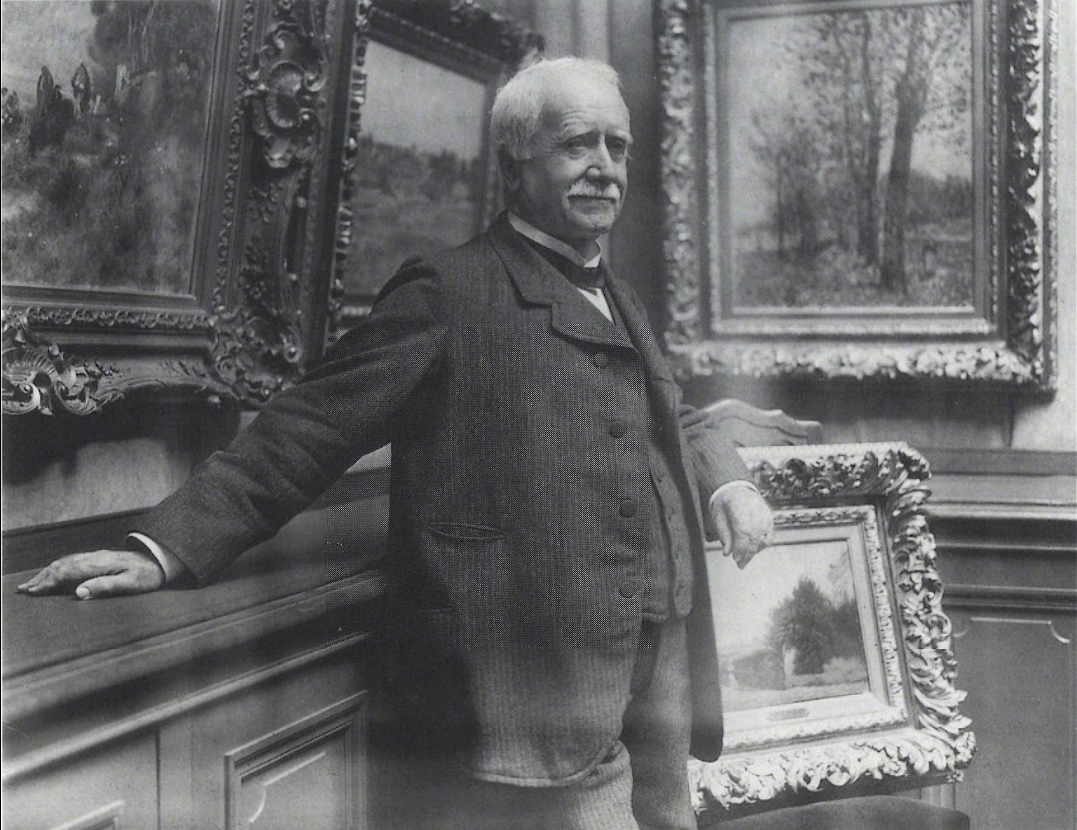
Paul Durand-Ruel in his gallery in 1910. Photo by Dornac

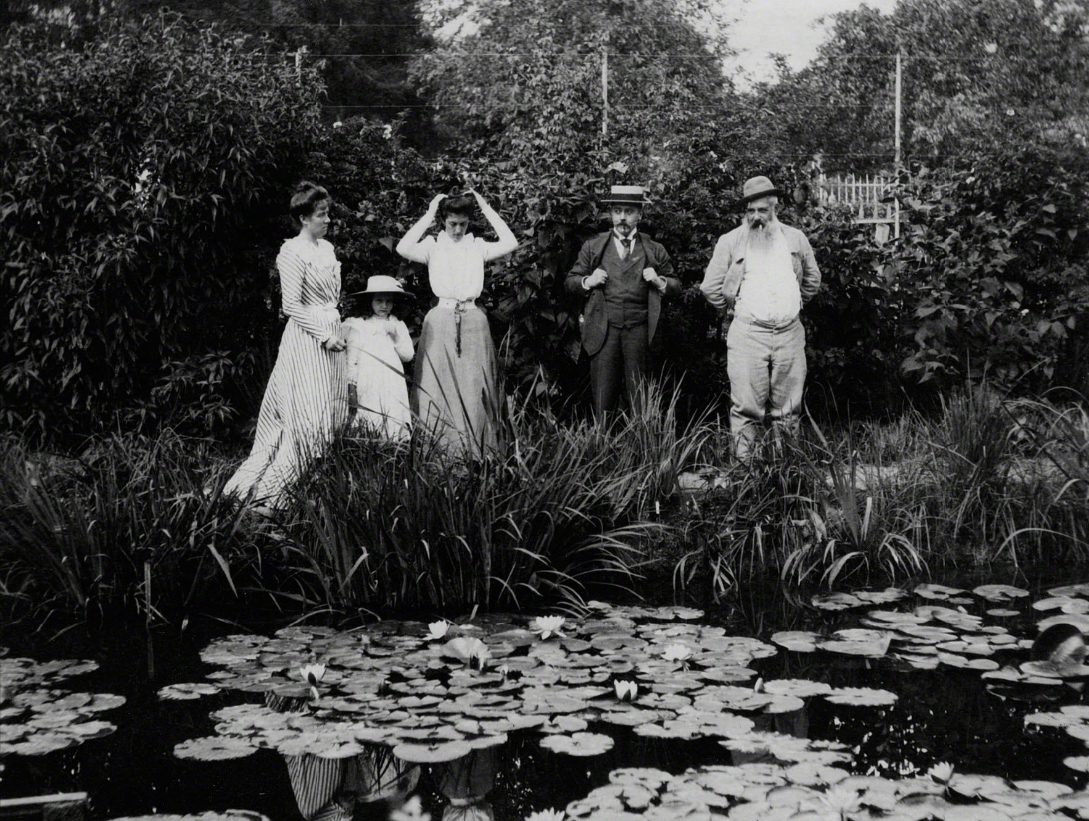
Durand-Ruel and Claude Monet in Giverny, 1900

He recognized the artistic and fashionable potential of Impressionism as early as 1870, and his first major exhibition of their work took place at his London gallery in 1872. Eventually Durand-Ruel had exhibitions of Impressionism and other works (including the expatriate American painter James Abbott McNeill Whistler who lived in London), at his Paris and London galleries. During the final three decades of the 19th century, Durand-Ruel became the most important commercial advocate of French Impressionism in the world. He succeeded in establishing the market for Impressionism in the United States as well as in Europe. Edgar Degas, Mary Cassatt, Édouard Manet, Claude Monet, Berthe Morisot, Camille Pissarro, Pierre-Auguste Renoir, and Alfred Sisley are among the important Impressionist artists that Durand-Ruel helped to establish. He represented many lesser known artists including Maxime Dethomas or Hugues Merle amongst others.

Part of the success of Impressionism was due to the international demand. Durand-Ruel established a network of galleries and exhibitions in many countries, with hubs in London, New York, and Berlin. Regarding the Americans' open-mindedness towards Impressionism, Durand-Ruel once said, "The American public does not laugh. It buys!" "Without America," he said, "I would have been lost, ruined, after having bought so many Monets and Renoirs. The two exhibitions there in 1886 saved me. The American public bought moderately . . . but thanks to that public, Monet and Renoir were enabled to live and after that the French public followed suit."

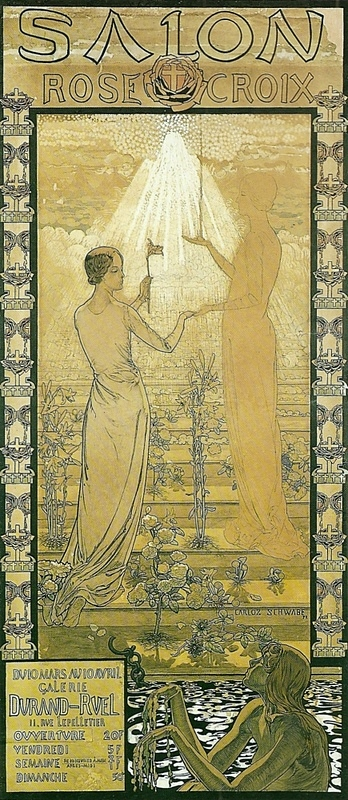
Original poster designed by Carlos Schwabe for the First Rosecrucian Exposition, which took place at the Galerie Durand Ruel, Paris, in 1892

=== London ===
During the Franco-Prussian War of 1870–71, Durand-Ruel left Paris and escaped to London, where he met up with a number of exiled French artists including Charles-François Daubigny, Claude Monet and Camille Pissarro. In December 1870, he opened the first of ten Annual Exhibitions of the Society of French Artists at his new London gallery at 168 New Bond Street, under the management of Charles Deschamps.

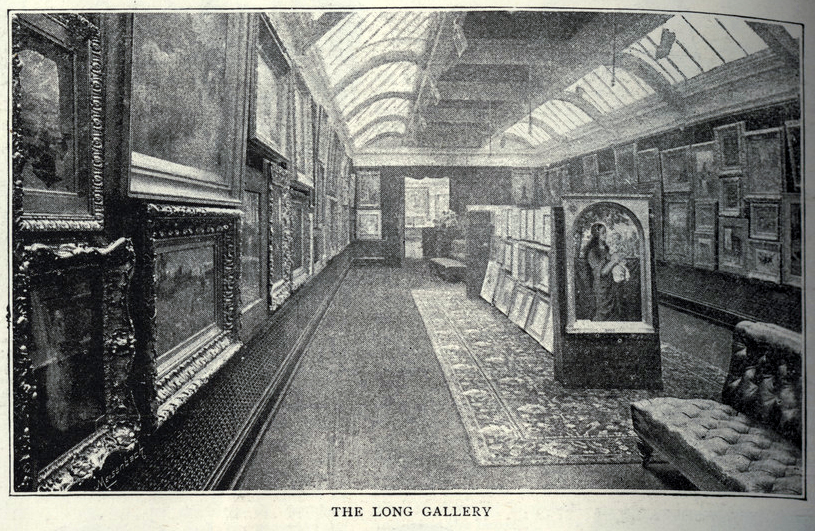
The main hall of The Grafton Galleries, 1905

In London, Durand-Ruel pioneered many new strategies for exhibiting art such as providing a catalogue for each exhibition, charging an entrance fee, and strategically placing unknown works next to high-priced art to increase its value. During this time, he acquired iconic paintings of the early 19th century, such as Jacques-Louis David's Marat and Delacroix's Death of Sardanapalus to showcase in his exhibitions and enhance publicity.

It was during this time that Durand-Ruel began to introduce paintings by the then unknown Monet and Pissarro in his exhibitions. From 1872, he began making large purchases of Impressionist paintings. Durand-Ruel hosted London's first exclusively Impressionist exhibitions in 1882 and 1883. These exhibitions proved unsuccessful and almost bankrupted Durand-Ruel's enterprise.

In 1905, Durand-Ruel returned to London to showcase a massive exhibition of Impressionist paintings originating mostly from his private collection. The Grafton Galleries contained 315 paintings from Manet, Boudin, Pissarro, Renoir, and Monet. While the show only provided 13 direct sales for Durand-Ruel, it sparked an interest among international art collectors in Impressionism.

=== United States ===
His business dealings with American collectors began during the 1860s, but were initially kept to short-term ventures, such as exhibitions in Boston and Philadelphia, as well as client visits in Paris. Durand-Ruel opened his first permanent gallery in the United States in 1887. The New York City based enterprise is seen as a cornerstone to Durand-Ruel's success with Impressionism.

Durand-Ruel & Sons was the official name of his American venture, which included his sons Joseph, Charles, and Georges by 1893. In 1915, he exhibited works by Monet at the Panama–Pacific International Exposition in San Francisco. With the help of his sons, Durand-Ruel was able to have a permanent presence in the United States. In addition to the permanent gallery in New York City, he organized exhibitions in Boston, Philadelphia, Cincinnati, St. Louis, and Chicago, among other locations. The family-run American enterprise continued operating after Paul Durand-Ruel's death until 1950.

=== Germany ===
Durand-Ruel's business in Germany came soon after his success in the United States. Germany hosted its first exhibition of the Impressionists in 1883, with the help of Durand-Ruel. With his main focus in the United States in the 1880s, Paul Durand-Ruel's presence in Germany came through the help of the German art critique Emil Heilbut, who purchased and sold many paintings between 1880 and 1896. His connection with German painter Max Liebermann led to exhibitions in Dresden, Berlin, and Hamburg of both French Impressionism and later work by Liebermann himself.

From 1899, Durand-Ruel's business in Germany was focused in Berlin, through a collaboration with German art dealer Paul Cassirer, who operated a permanent art gallery there.

=== Art markets ===
His strategy followed seven innovative principles:

1. Protect and defend art above all else
2. The exclusivity of the artists' production
3. Individual exhibitions
4. A network of international galleries
5. Free access to his galleries and to his apartment
6. Promote the artists' work via the press
7. Associate the art world with the finance world

Through these principles, Durand-Ruel transformed art markets into a system where artists are monetarily supported by financiers impressed by their work. Between 1891 and 1922, Durand-Ruel purchased nearly 12,000 paintings. In 1920, at the age of 89, he declared: "At last the Impressionist masters triumphed just as the generation of 1830 had. My madness had been wisdom. To think that, had I passed away at sixty, I would have died debt-ridden and bankrupt, surrounded by a wealth of underrated treasures…"

== Artists ==
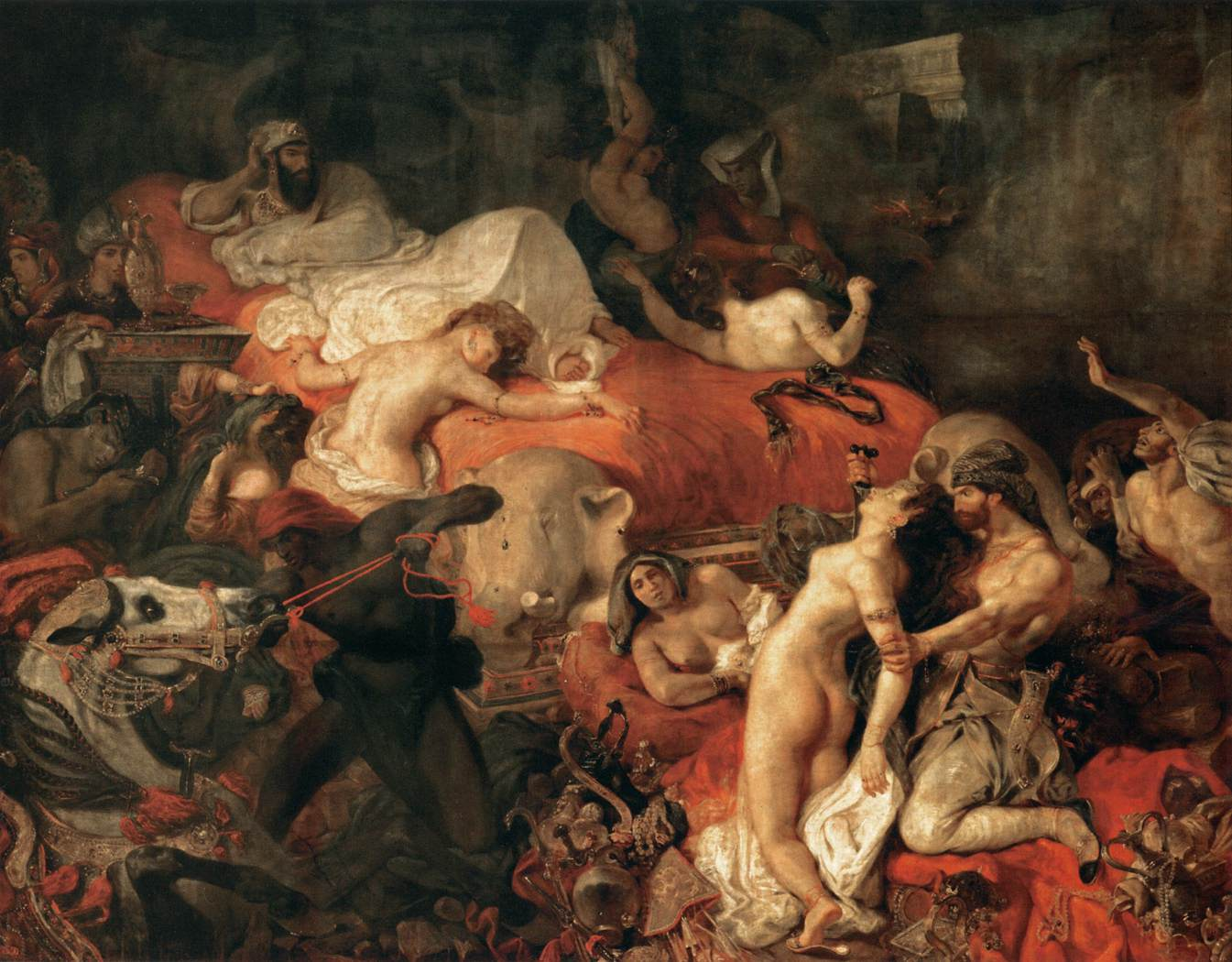
Delacroix's Death of Sardanapalus, shown at the Daumier Exhibition on April 17, 1878. It was Delacroix's work that first captivated Durand-Ruel in 1855, and inspired him to pursue art dealing.

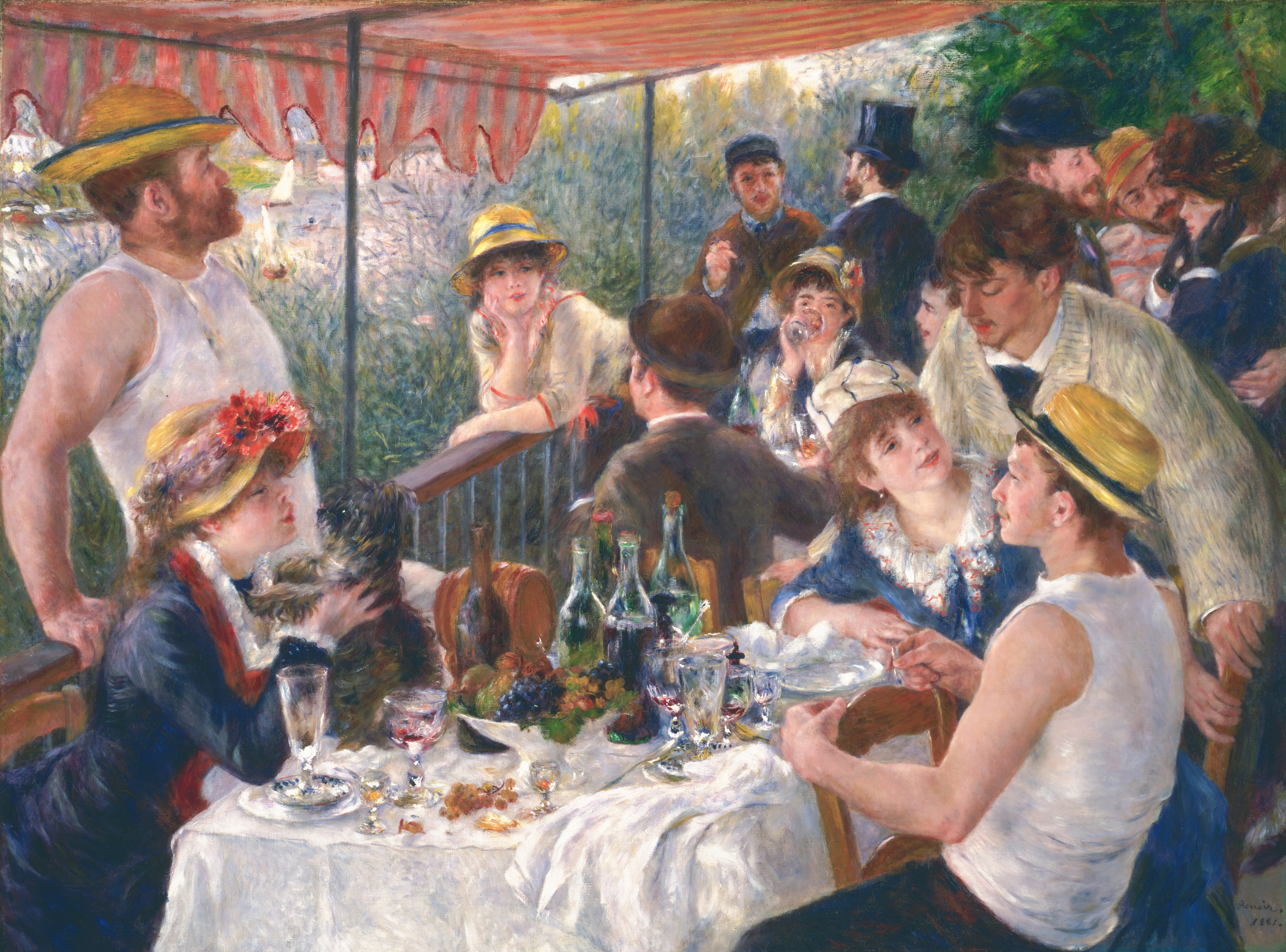
Renoir's Luncheon of the Boating Party once hung in Durand-Ruel's personal apartment, where he received clients and hosted dinners in a home setting.

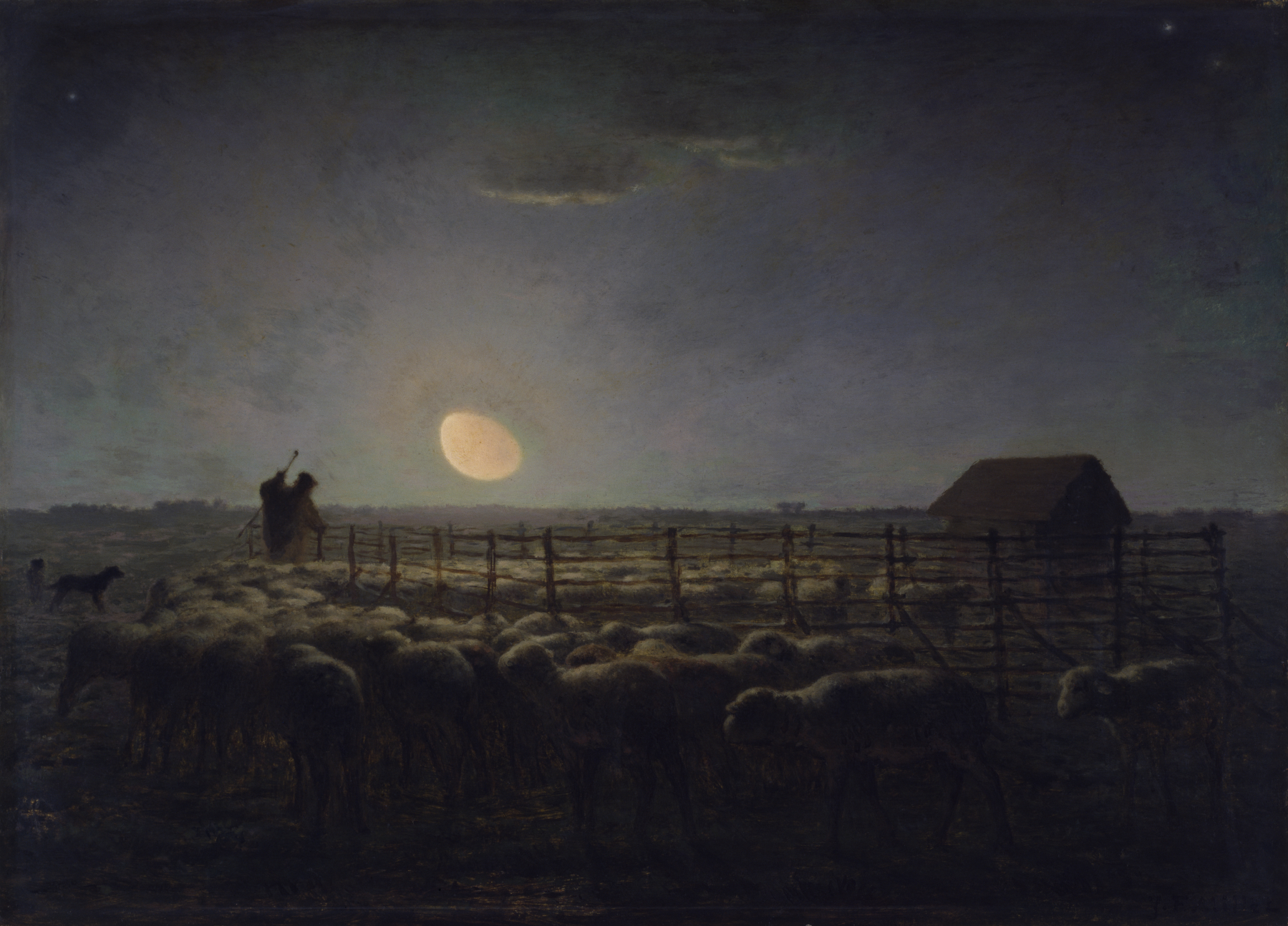
Millet's The Sheepfold, Moonlight was acquired by Durand-Ruel in 1872, who believed it to be Millet's 'masterpiece'.

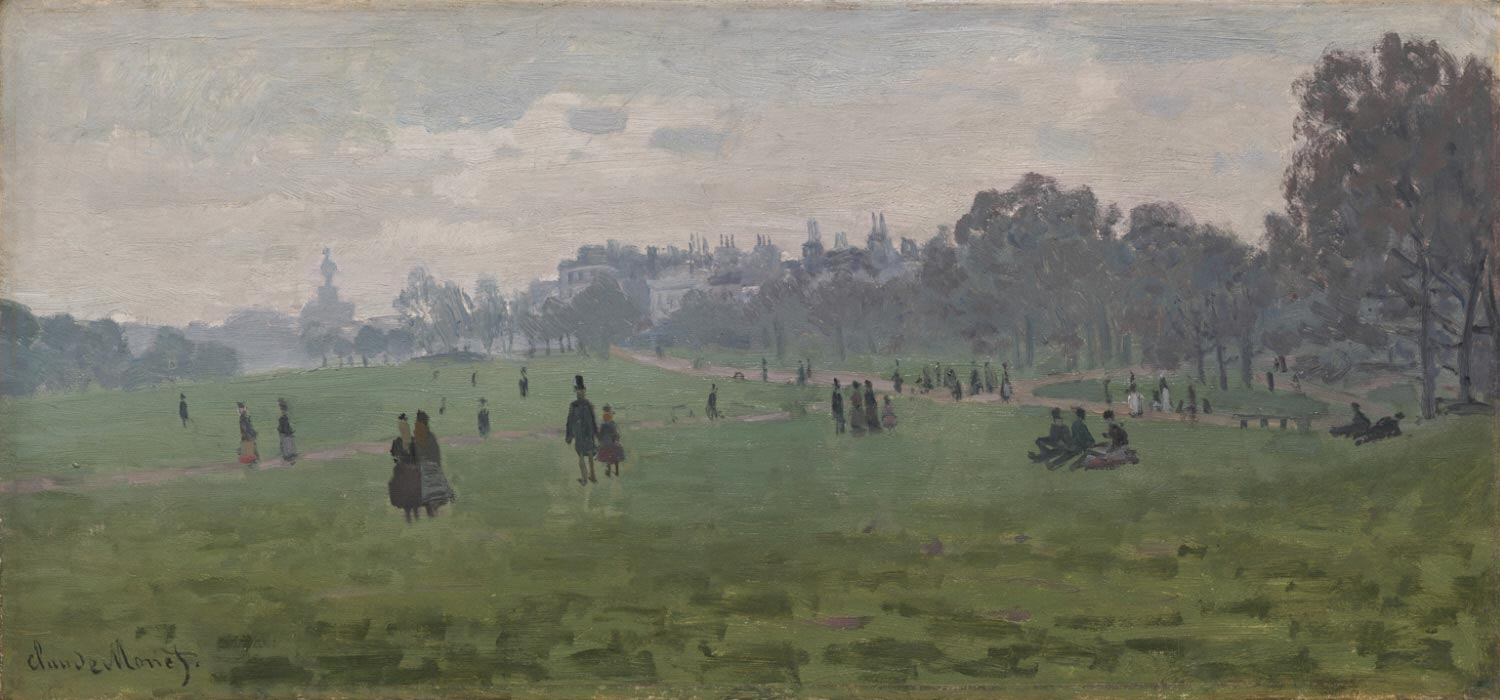
Monet's Green Park, London, was one of the first paintings by Monet purchased by Paul Durand-Ruel, in 1872.

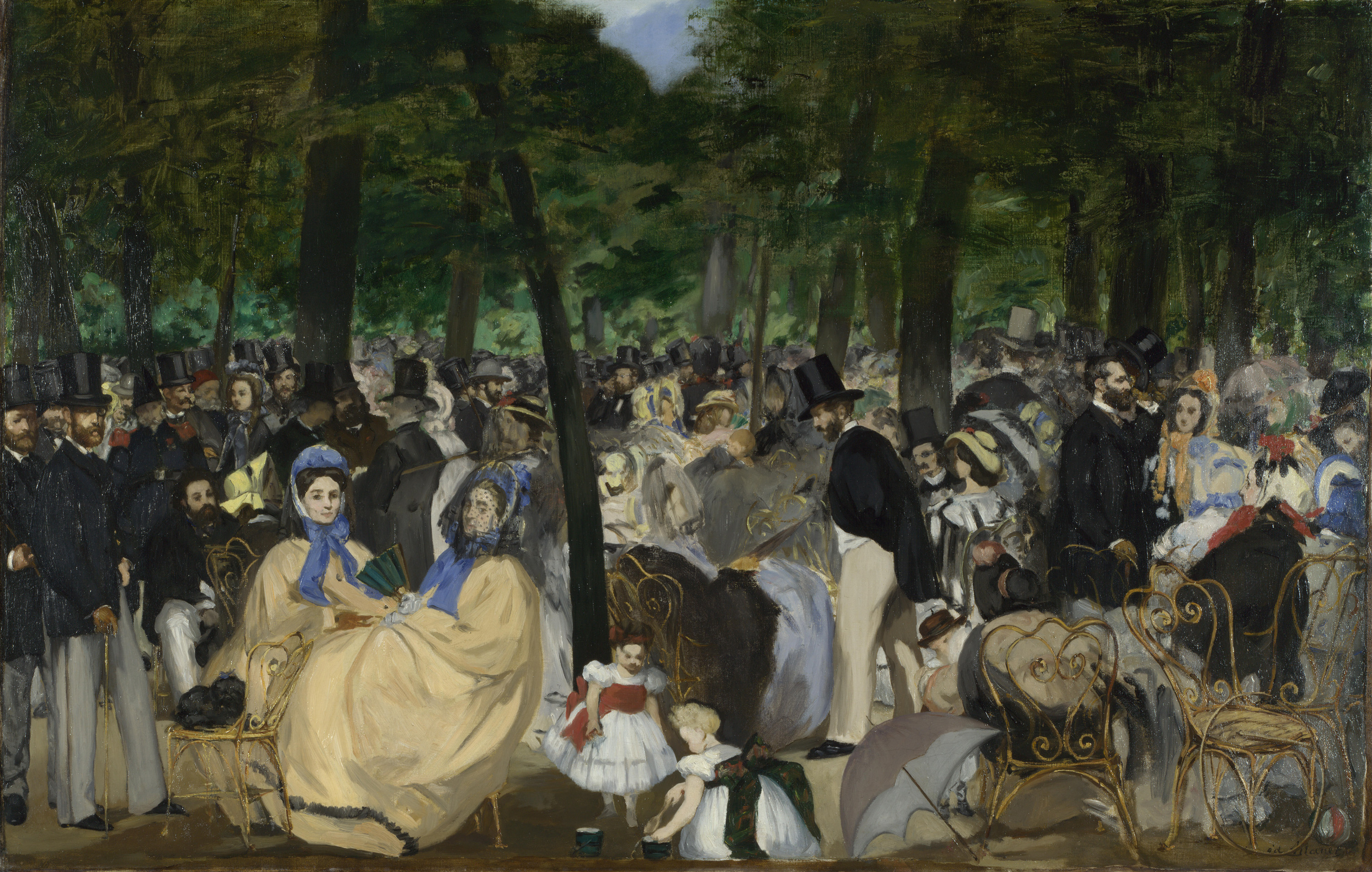
One of Edouard Manet's La Musique Aux Tuileries was purchased by Durand-Ruel on a visit to the artist's studio in 1872. It was later featured in the Grafton Galleries in London and given a prominent position.

Artists supported by Paul Durand-Ruel
Name	Lifespan	Movement	# of Works linked to Paul Durand-Ruel
ANDRE, Albert	1869-1954	Post-Impressionism	
BARYE, Antoine-Louis	1795-1895	Sculptor	
BENASSIT, Émile	1833-1902	Genre	
BOUDIN, Eugène	1824-1898	Impressionism	~400
BROWN, John-Lewis	1829-1890	Genre	
CAILLEBOTTE, Gustave	1848-1894	Realism, Impressionism	
CASSATT, Mary	1844-1926	Impressionism	~400
CEZANNE, Paul	1839-1906	Impressionism	
COROT, Jean-Baptiste	1796-1875	Realism	~300
COURBET, Gustave	1819-1877	Realism	>30
DAUBIGNY, Charles-François	1817-1878	Realism	
DAUMIER, Honoré	1808-1879	Realism, Impressionism	
DEGAS, Edgar	1834-1917	Impressionism	~400
DELACROIX, Eugène	1798-1863	Romanticism	~200
DIAZ DE LA PENA, Narcisse-Virgile	1807-1876	Orientalism	
DURENNE, Eugène-Antoine	1860-1944	Impressionism	
EDZARD, Dietz	1893-1963	Impressionism	
ESPAGNAT, Georges d'	1870-1950	Post-Impressionism	
FANTIN-LATOUR, Henri Théodore Jean Ignace	1836-1904	Impressionism	
FORAIN, Jean-Louis	1852-1931	Impressionism	
GAUGUIN, Paul	1848-1903	Impressionism	
GUILLAUMIN, Jean-Baptiste-Armand	1841-1927	Impressionism	
HASSAM, Childe	1859-1935	Impressionism	
HELLEU, Paul-César	1859-1927	Post-Impressionism	
HOSCHEDE-MONET, Blanche	1865-1947	Impressionism	
HUGUET, Victor-Pierre	1835-1902	Orientalism	
JONGKIND, Johan ou Jean-Barthold	1819-1891	Impressionism	
KHMELUK, Vassyl	1903-1986	Post-Impressionism	
LEPINE, Stanislas-Victor-Edouard	1835-1892	Impressionism	
LOISEAU, Gustave	1865-1935	Post-Impressionism	
MANET, Edouard	1832-1883	Realism, Impressionism	~200
MAUFRA, Maxime, Maxime-Emile-Louis	1861-1918	Impressionism	
MILLET, Jean François	1814-1875	Realism	>61
MONET, Claude	1840-1926	Impressionism	~1,000
MORET, Henry	1856-1913	Impressionism	
MORISOT, Berthe	1841-1895	Impressionism	
PISSARRO, Camille	1830-1903	Impressionism	~800
PUVIS DE CHAVANNES, Pierre	1824-1898	Symbolism	
REDON, Odilon	1840-1916	Post-Impressionism	
RENOIR, Pierre-Auguste	1841-1919	Impressionism	~1,500
RODIN, August	1840-1917	Sculptor	
ROUSSEAU, Théodore	1812-1867	Realism, Romanticism	~100
SISLEY, Alfred	1839-1899	Impressionism	~400
TOULOUSE-LAUTREC, Henri de	1864-1901	Post-Impressionism	
VALTAT, Louis	1869-1952	Fauvism	
VIGNON, Victor-Alfred-Paul	1847-1909	Impressionism	
ZANDOMENEGHI, Federico	1841-1917	Impressionism	
ZIEM, Félix-François-Georges-Philibert	1821-1911	Orientalism	

== Death and legacy ==
Durand-Ruel died on 5 February 1922 in Paris.

While Paul Durand-Ruel has the legacy of bringing art to the free market, he viewed the pursuit of art as an end in itself. By seeking out the most authentic art, and investing in artists that he believed showed talent above all else, Durand-Ruel pioneered what it meant to be a modern art dealer. Furthermore, both Paul Durand-Ruel and his father attempted to separate their own political views from the subject matter of the art they supported; despite being conservatives, the Durand-Ruels invested in the progressive École de 1830. As a result of his approach to art-dealing, Durand-Ruel is considered as the first dealer to show an appreciation for Impressionist art.

Durand-Ruel was the subject of a major temporary exhibition titled "Inventing Impressionism" held at the National Gallery in London in 2015.

Durand-Ruel owned a violin made by Francois Lupot in 1810 until his death. He bought the violin from Albert Caressa as stated on the certificate issued by Jacques Français in 1955. The violin was sold at auction in October 2023.

== Archives ==
The Department of Image Collections at the National Gallery of Art Library holds over 15,000 photographs documenting works of art that moved through Durand-Ruel's New York gallery.
