= Stephen Merrill =

Stephen, Steve, or Steven Merrill is the name of:

- Stephen Mason Merrill (1825–1905), American bishop of the Methodist Episcopal Church
- Steve Merrill (1946–2020), American lawyer and the 87th Governor of New Hampshire, U.S.A.
