= Harel =

Harel is both a surname and a given name. Notable people with the name include:

== Surname ==
- Alon Harel (1957–), Israeli law professor
- Dan Harel (1955–), general in the Israeli Defense Force
- David Harel (1950–), computer sciences professor
- Eden Harel (1976–), Israeli actress and TV host
- Idit Harel Caperton (1957–), Israeli psychologist and epistemologist
- Isser Harel (1912–2003), Israeli spymaster
- Louise Harel (1946–), Canadian politician
- Philippe Harel (1956–), French film director, actor and screenwriter
- Rachel (Roos-Hertz) Harel (1923–1989), member of the Dutch Resistance
- Yitzhak Harel (1957–), general in the Israeli Defense Force
- Yossi Harel (1918–2008), Israeli captain, member of the Israel intelligence community

== Given name ==
- Harel Levy (born 1978), Israeli professional tennis player
- Harel Locker (born 1965), Israeli lawyer and civil servant
- Harel Moyal (born 1981), Israeli singer, songwriter and stage actor
- Harel Skaat (born 1981), Israeli singer
- Harel Srugo (born 1982), Israeli tennis player

== See also ==
- Harel Brigade, Israeli army brigade. One of four formed out of the Palmach in 1948
- Harel Group, an insurance and financial services company in Israel
- Harel, Israel, a kibbutz in Israel
- 20279 Harel, an asteroid
