= Meryl =

Meryl is a given name. Its origins are unclear, and include the following possibilities:

- Variant of Muriel, with Scottish and Irish Gaelic origins, meaning "bright sea"
- Of Greek origin, relating to myrrh
- A combination of Mary (derived from the Hebrew name Miriam) and Beryl (derived from the Latin name for the gemstone beryl)

People and fictional characters with this given name include:

== People ==
- Meryl Cassie (born 1984), New Zealand actress
- Meryl Davis (born 1987), American ice dancer
- Meryl Fernandes (born 1983), British actress
- Meryl Fernando (1923-2007), Sri Lankan Sinhala teacher, trade unionist, and politician
- Meryl Frank, American politician, diplomat, and author
- Meryl Getline (1953–2019), American pilot, author, and columnist
- Meryl Mark (1938-2006), South African tennis player
- Meryl McMaster (born 1988), Canadian and Plains Cree photographer
- Meryl Meisler (born 1951), American photographer
- Meryl O'Loughlin (1933–2007), American casting agent and casting director
- Meryl Poster, American film producer, founding president of Superb Entertainment
- Meryl Sexton, Australian judge
- Meryl Smith (born 2001), Scottish rugby union player
- Meryl Streep (born 1949), American actress
- Meryl Swanson (born 1970), Australian politician
- Meryl Tankard (born 1955), Australian dancer and choreographer
- Meryl Vladimer (1951–2022), American artist, theatrical producer, and political activist

== Fictional characters ==
- Meryl Burbank, a character "played" by Hannah Gill in The Truman Show
- Meryl Silverburgh, a character who appears in Policenauts and in the Metal Gear series
- Meryl Stryfe, a character who appears in Trigun

== See also ==
- Maryla Rodowicz (born 1945), Polish pop singer
- Merryl Gibbs, American politician
