= Muriel (given name) =

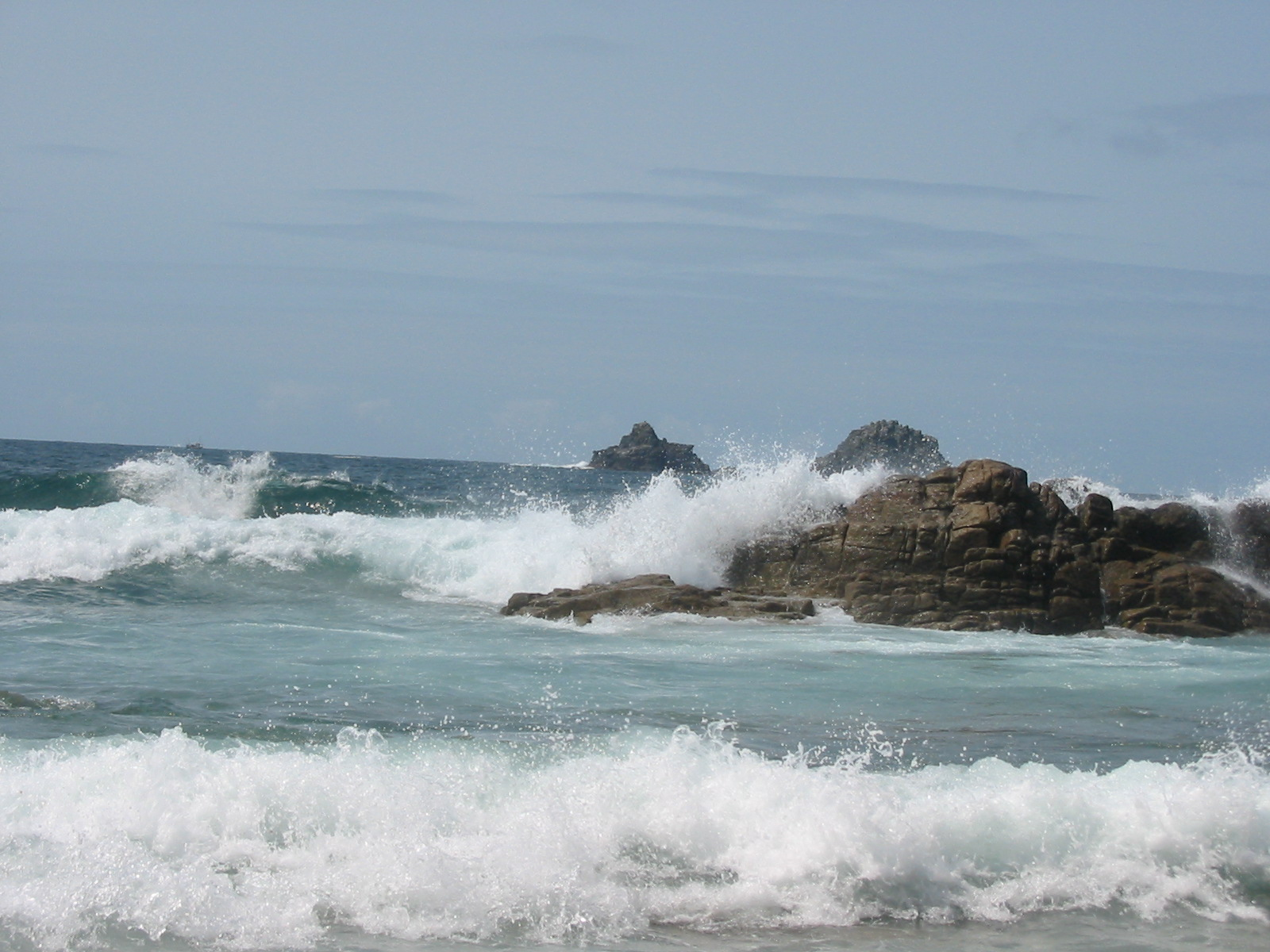
- Muriel is an English name derived from Celtic elements meaning "sea" and "bright"
- Pronunciation: /ˈmjʊəriəl/ MURE-ee-əl
- Gender: Feminine
- Language: English

Origin
- Language: Celtic

Other names
- Cognates: Muireall (Scottish Gaelic), Muirgheal (Irish)

Muriel /ˈmjʊəriəl/ MURE-ee-əl is a feminine given name in the English language.

== Origin/history ==
The name is of Goidelic origin and was originally spelled as Muirgheal (muir "sea", gheal "bright") in Irish and Muireall in Scottish Gaelic. Various versions have long been evident in Breton, Irish, and Scottish Gaelic languages. The name was very common in medieval England, typically in the form of "Merial". Unusually for a name of Celtic origin, it remained common after the Norman Conquest, although rare from about 1300.

Remaining common in Scotland as Muriel, the name in this form was introduced back into England in the mid-19th century, facilitated by Dinah Craik's 1856 novel John Halifax, Gentleman whose title character's daughter is named Muriel. Born in 1802, Muriel is said to be named "after the rather peculiar name of John's mother."

The name Meryl may be a variant of Muriel.

The name Muriel was listed in the top 200 names from 1912 to 1933, with its highest rate of popularity in the 1920s.

== People with the given name ==
- Muriel Anderson (born 1960), American guitarist
- Muriel Angelus (1912–2004), British actress
- Muriel Bamblett, advocate for Aboriginal child welfare in Victoria and Australia
- Muriel Barbery (born 1969), Moroccan-born French novelist
- Muriel Beaumont (1881–1957), British actress
- Muriel Bell (1898–1974), New Zealand nutritionist and researcher
- Muriel Bowser (born 1972), mayor of the District of Columbia
- Muriel Box (1905–1991), British screenwriter and film director
- Muriel Brandolini, French-Vietnamese interior designer
- Muriel Broadbent (Edith Hacon) (1875–1952), British socialite, suffragist, WWI women's hospital volunteer
- Muriel Brunskill (1899–1980), British contralto
- Muriel Casals i Couturier (1945–2016), French-born Catalan economist
- Muriel Cooper (1925–1994), American artist and designer
- Muriel Davisson, American neuroscientist
- Muriel Day (born 1942), Irish singer
- Muriel Duckworth (1908–2009), Canadian activist
- Muriel Evans (1910–2000), American actress
- Muriel Fox (born 1928), American public relations executive and feminist activist
- Muriel Forbes (1894–1991), British politician
- Muriel Glauert (1892–1949), British mathematician
- Muriel Gray (born 1958), Scottish author, broadcaster and journalist
- Muriel Gustavo Becker (born 1987), Brazilian male footballer
- Muriel Hannah (died 1969), Alaskan artist
- Muriel Hind (1882–1956), pioneering British motorcyclist and motorist described as "the first woman motorcyclist in England"
- Muriel Humphrey Brown (1912–1998), American "second lady", political wife and activist; briefly, a U.S. Senator
- Muriel Jones (1890–1974), South African dancer and philanthropist
- Muriel Kovitz (1926–2021), Chancellor Emeritus of the University of Calgary
- Muriel Lamb (1911–2010), New Zealand architect
- Muriel Langford (1913–2003), British/Australian missionary, linguist
- Muriel Lanchester (1902–1992), British puppeteer
- Muriel Lloyd Prichard (1905–1991), British academic, economist, and writer
- Muriel Irwin MacDonald (1867-1918), Canadian-born American newspaper and magazine editor
- Muriel Matters (1877–1969), Australian-born British suffragist, lecturer, journalist, educator, actress and elocutionist
- Muriel Miguel (born 1937), Native American theatre director and choreographer
- Muriel Millard (1922–2014), Canadian actress, dancer, painter, singer-songwriter
- Muriel Moody (1907–1991), New Zealand ceramic artist
- Muriel Nissel (1921–2010), British statistician and civil servant
- Lady Muriel Paget (1876–1938), English aristocrat, humanitarian, and relief organiser
- Muriel Pavlow (1921–2019), British actress
- Muriel E. Platt (1905–1953), American biochemist
- Muriel Robinson (born 1954), British academic administrator and education scholar
- Muriel Rukeyser (1913–1980), American poet and political activist
- Muriel Smith (politician) (born 1930), Canadian politician from Manitoba
- Muriel Smith (singer) (1923–1985), American mezzo-soprano
- Muriel Spark (1918–2006), Scottish novelist
- Muriel Stanley Venne – Indigenous women's rights advocate
- Muriel the Poetess (11th century), poet at Wilton Abbey
- Muriel Thomasset (born 1971), French physicist specializing in optics
- Muriel Thompson (1875–1939), Scottish World War I ambulance driver, racing driver and suffragist
- Muriel Villanueva i Perarnau (born 1976), Spanish writer
- Muriel Watt (1917–2005), New Zealand landscape architect
- Muriel Window (1892–1965), American singer, Ziegfeld Girl, pilot, restaurant owner
- Muriel Young (1923–2001), English television continuity announcer, presenter and producer

== Fictional characters ==
- Muriel (Animal Farm), a goat in George Orwell's novel Animal Farm
- Muriel, the main antagonist in the 2013 film Hansel & Gretel: Witch Hunters
- Muriel, hotel maid who was a recurring character in the family sitcom The Suite Life of Zack & Cody
- Muriel, a naïve junior angel, in series 2 of the fantasy-comedy series Good Omens
- Muriel, an angel, the youngest brother of angels Lucifer Morningstar and Uriel in the Fox TV series Lucifer
- Muriel Bagge, one of the main characters in Courage the Cowardly Dog
- Chandler Muriel Bing, one of the male lead roles in the US TV sitcom Friends (1994–2004)
- Muriel P. Finster in the animated series Recess
- Muriel Glass in J. D. Salinger's short story "A Perfect Day for Bananafish"
- Muriel Goldman, a supporting character in the series Family Guy
- Muriel Hardwicke, the main antagonist of Eva Ibbotson's 1981 historical romance A Countess Below Stairs
- Muriel Heslop, lead character in the 1994 Australian film Muriel's Wedding
- Muriel McComber, teenage lead role in the Eugene O'Neill play Ah, Wilderness! (1933)
- Lady Muriel Orme, one of the main characters in Lewis Carroll's Sylvie and Bruno novels
- Muriel Pritchett, character in the Anne Tyler novel The Accidental Tourist (1985)
- Muriel Rush, female lead role in the sitcom Too Close for Comfort
- Muriel Stacy, Anne's teacher in Anne of Green Gables
- Muriel Taggert, the villain of the first Fablehaven book
- Muriel Prewett, great-aunt of Ron Weasley in Harry Potter and the Deathly Hallows (2009)
- Muriel Alison Goldberg Schwartz, daughter of Erica Goldberg Schwartz and Geoffrey Schwartz in The Goldbergs (2022)

== See also ==
- List of Irish-language given names
- Mariel (given name)
