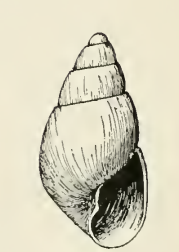
- Apertural view of a shell of Odostomia nunivakensis

Scientific classification
- Kingdom: Animalia
- Phylum: Mollusca
- Class: Gastropoda
- Family: Pyramidellidae
- Genus: Odostomia
- Species: O. nunivakensis

Binomial name
- Odostomia nunivakensis Dall & Bartsch, 1909

Synonyms
- Evalea nunivakensis (Dall & Bartsch, 1909)

= Odostomia nunivakensis =

Species of gastropod

Odostomia nunivakensis is a species of sea snail, a marine gastropod mollusc in the family Pyramidellidae, the pyrams and their allies.

== Description ==
The milk-white shell is elongate ovate and deeply umbilicated. The whorls of the protoconch are small, deeply obliquely immersed in the first of the succeeding turns. The five whorls of the teleoconch are increasing very regularly in size, rather high between the sutures, well rounded with strongly tabulated summits. The sutures are strongly marked. The periphery and the base of the body whorl are well rounded. The spiral sculpture consisting of incised lines only. The umbilicus is bounded by a slender thread. The aperture is elongate-ovate. The posterior angle is obtuse. The outer lip is thin. The columella is slender, ε-shaped, slightly revolute, free from the base, armed with a strong fold near its center. The entire surface is crossed by fine lines of growth and exceedingly fine, closely spaced, wavy spiral striations. (The spiral striations have been omitted in the drawing).

== Distribution ==
The type specimen was found off Nunivak Island, Alaska
