= Muriel Hannah =

American artist (died 1969)

- Born: Yorkshire, England
- Died: March 10, 1969; Jamaica

Muriel Hannah (died 1969) was an American artist. Born in England, she spent much of her life in Alaska. She was known for her portraits of Native Alaskans and an illustrated map of Alaska that she painted while in the employ of Northern Consolidated Airlines.

Born in Yorkshire, Hannah moved to the United States at a young age and studied at the Museum School in Boston and the Art Students League of New York. She visited Alaska in 1941 at the invitation of a friend, returning in 1947. During her trips, she drew landscapes and portraits of the Alaska Native people and, in 1949, was commissioned by Ray Petersen and his firm, Northern Consolidated Airlines, to paint a mural map of Alaska. This map was displayed in several museums and the Department of the Interior Building before being returned to Alaska in the 1950s, by which point Hannah herself had also taken up residence in the territory. She continued working for Northern in their publicity department, where she continued to draw portraits. Some of these were re-produced in calendars published by the airline.

Hannah died in 1969 while on vacation in Jamaica with her sister. A scholarship for Alaska Native art students at the University of Alaska, Anchorage, was set up in her honor.

== Early life and education ==
Muriel Hannah was born in Yorkshire, England. Her father, Randolph Hannah, was also an artist; he worked with watercolors and died when Hannah was young. At either the age of 5 or 14, Hannah and her sister moved to the United States, where they were raised by six aunts in the Boston area. Hannah studied art at the Museum School in Boston, where, in 1916, she received a scholarship from the Art Students League of New York. She continued her studies at the League, in addition to her native England.

== Career ==
=== Early career and visits to Alaska ===
Muriel Hannah left the East Coast after college; she held an exhibit in Chicago and eventually ended up doing portraits at the Bremerton Naval Yard in the state of Washington. By 1933 she had made her way to California, where she continued to work as an artist. In New Orleans, she created portraits and costumes at Mardi Gras parades and balls.

Hannah first came to Alaska on the invitation of a friend; she was invited by Charles J. Johnson, of the Goodnews Bay Mining Co., to visit Platinum, a mining town on Goodnews Bay. She flew with pilot Ray Petersen; it was Hannah's first time flying. She stayed in the Alaskan town for three months and did watercolors of the surrounding landscapes. She returned to Alaska for a longer visit, this time 6 months, in 1947.

=== Mural of Alaska ===
In 1949, due to her acquaintance with Petersen (by then president of Northern Consolidated Airlines), Hannah was commissioned to draw a map of Alaska to hang in the firm's Seattle offices. To prepare, she took flights across Alaska, sketching the scenery beneath her to use as a reference. She did the actual painting at her rooms in the New Richmond Hotel in Seattle, where she worked with oil paints; the canvas obstructed access to her closet, forcing her to keep her clothes on a ladder. The map did not mark locations with place names, but rather with drawings depicting Alaskan animals and resources and a portrait of Ernest Gruening in the bottom right corner. The mural initially took her eleven months to finish and when it was done measured fifteen and a half feet by nine feet.

Upon seeing the map, the Northern Consolidated executives thought that it belonged in a museum rather than their offices, and the map was sent on a tour of the United States, arranged by the General Federation of Women's Clubs. Before it was actually finished, it had already been displayed in November, 1950 at the Alaska Science Conference in the Department of the Interior foyer. It was then displayed for either three or five weeks in the Albert W. Harris Hall of Chicago's Field Museum of Natural History (where it was completed), then the Seattle Museum of Natural History, and the North Dakota Agricultural College in the Lower 48. In Alaska, it hung at a temporary exhibitions in the Westward Hotel and the Mel Kohler studios, and was brought up for the opening of a Northern Consolidated hangar in 1952. Once finished with the tour, the map was returned to Alaska permanently to be hung in an Alaska Methodist College building. As the building hadn't been finished, it was exhibited in 1957 at the offices of the Anchorage Daily Times. During this time, Hannah made a series of updates to the map. She painted over Gruening's face with a cloud, intending to replace him with the State of Alaska's first governor, added a portrait of Mike Stepovich and his eight children in Juneau, and painted an oil derrick on the Kenai peninsula to commemorate the 1957 discovery of oil there by the Richfield Oil Company. Prints of the map were sold in the McKinley Gift Shop and Anchorage Treasure Shop.

=== Employment with airlines and further exhibitions ===
Once the map was initially finished, Hannah continued working for Northern Consolidated Airlines in their publicity department. She returned to Alaska in 1953 full time to continue to studies of the Native Alaskan people in Kotzebue and the Kuskokwim region.

In 1955 and 1956, when she was the firm's company artist, Hannah took a series of three trips to Mekoryuk, Nunivuk Island, and the Kuskokwim area to draw portraits of the Native residents. She stayed with teachers Robert & Harriet Gibson while on Nunivak and Rev. C. B. Michaels whilst in Quinhagak. 40 of these portraits were then used in a 1956 exhibit at the Westward Hotel and the Mel Kohler studios, along with the map.

Hannah took temporary leave from her job at Northern Consolidated in the spring of 1958, when commissioned by the owners of the Monticello Hotel in Longview, Washington, to paint a New Orleans inspired mural for the cocktail lounge. In 1961, an illustration she made was included in the second edition of the Alaska Hunting and Fishing Guide, edited by Herb Rhodes and Ed Fortier, and in 1962, she finished a commission for Muktuk Marston for an illustrated map with a picture that, in Marston's words, "combines man's greatest desires – a good looking girl on a King Crab". The map was a publicity effort for Marston's belief that there should be a borough covering the entirety of the Cook Inlet Drainage, from Homer to Denali. It took Hannah three months to make, and Marston was satisfied with the outcome.

By 1964, Hannah had become the assistant to their public relations director at Northern. Her pictures of Yup'ik and Inupiat children were featured on their calendars for many years, which continued when the airline merged with Wien Alaska to become Wien Consolidated Airlines.

Hannah also displayed her work at several Christmas exhibits organized by the Anchorage Quota Club, of which she was a member; years she worked in included 1963 1965, 1966, and 1967. Her work was also displayed at the 1967 Alaska Festival of Native Arts, the Alaska 67 Centennial Art Exhibit, the 1968 opening of the Anchorage Fine Arts Museum, and she had two paintings selected for the Alaska Purchase Centennial Juried Art Show in Fairbanks.

== Death ==
Hannah died on March 10, 1969, while on vacation with her sister in Jamaica. At the time of her death, she was living in the Turnagain Arms Apartments. Within a few weeks of her death, a memorial service and art show at the Pioneer Hall and the Anchorage Historical and Fine Arts Museum, respectively, were scheduled. Sponsored by the Anchorage branch of the Quota Club, the exhibit had both finished and unfinished examples of Hannah's art.

A scholarship for Native Alaskan art students at the University of Alaska, Anchorage, named after Hannah, was established after her death. Initial funds came from the sale of prints the scholarship committee purchased from Hannah's estate and prints of her calendars, with the permission of Ray Peterson.

== Art ==
Hannah worked primarily with pastels, watercolors, and oil paints, though she described her favourite medium as watercolors. Her most-known works were her map and her portraits of Native Alaskans; Hannah felt that the Inupiat and Yup'ik people she painted had faces that were easier to draw than Caucasian people. She and Claire Fejes were some of the only women artists who did portraits of people in the Bush during the time period.

In addition to her drawings, Hannah also worked as an interior decorator and made theatre costumes. The Longview Daily News described her as a "roving artist". During one of her trips, she visited Alaskan artist Moses Wassilie when he was a thirteen year old boy; he later credited her demonstrations for his interest in art.

Several of her paintings, along with some by Harvey Goodale, were destroyed in a fire in Fairbanks before 1972; copies were preserved in the Alaska Transportation Museum.
