= Nunivak Island =

Island of Alaska

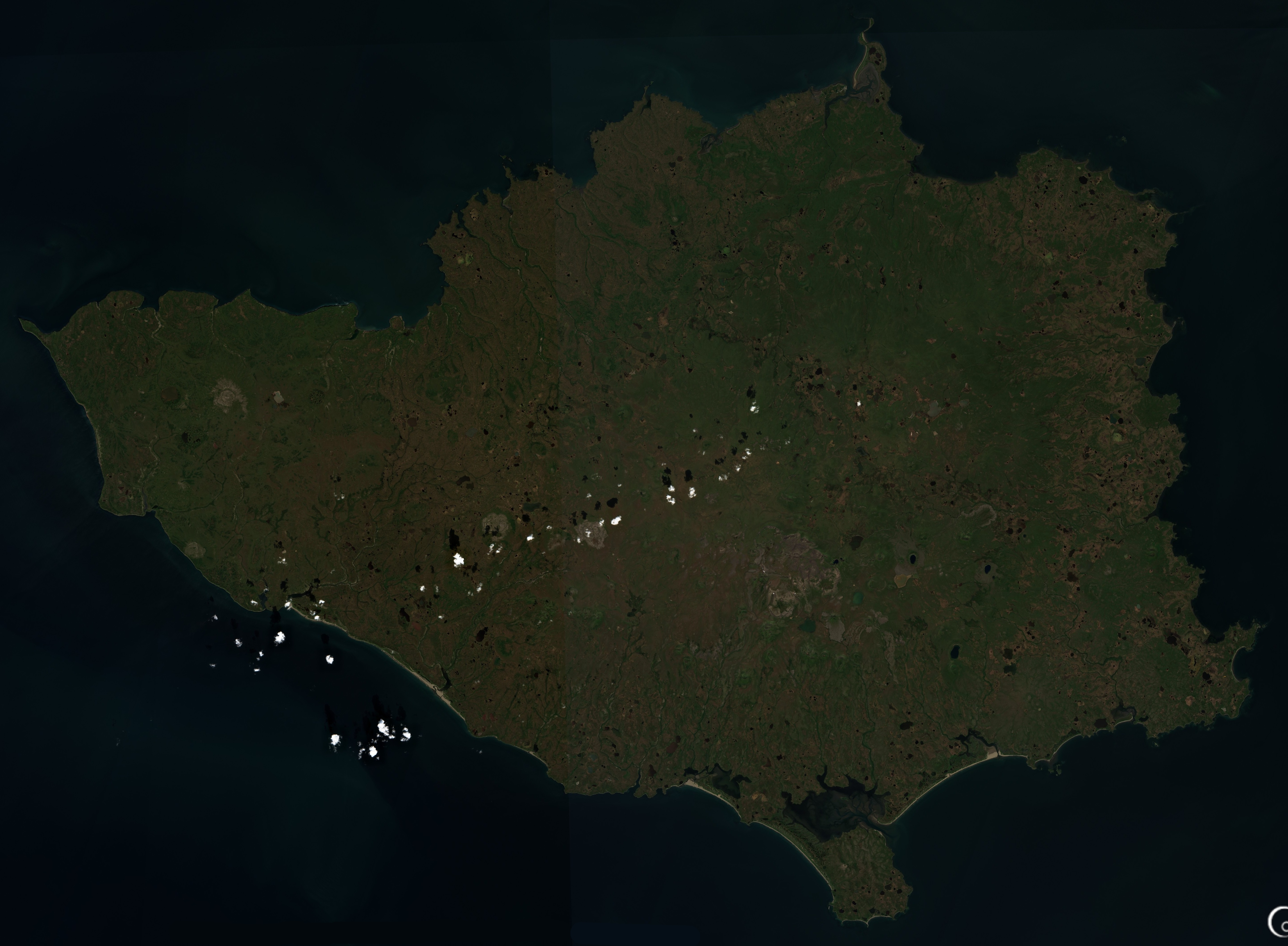
- Satellite image of the island

- Location within Alaska

Geography
- Location: Bering Sea
- Coordinates: 60°05′42″N 166°12′40″W
- Area: 1,631.97 sq mi (4,226.8 km^{2})
- Length: 77 km (47.8 mi)
- Width: 106 km (65.9 mi)
- Highest elevation: 1,675 ft (510.5 m)
- Highest point: Roberts Mountain

Administration
- United States
- State: Alaska
- Census Area: Bethel Census Area
- Largest settlement: Mekoryuk (pop. 191)

Demographics
- Population: 191 (2010)
- Pop. density: 0.05/km^{2} (0.13/sq mi)
- Ethnic groups: Cup'it Inuit

Nunivak Island (Central Alaskan Yup'ik: Nunivaaq; Nunivak Cup'ig: Nuniwar; Russian: Нунивак, romanized: Nunivak) is a permafrost-covered volcanic island lying about 30 miles (48 km) offshore from the delta of the Yukon and Kuskokwim rivers in the US state of Alaska, at a latitude of about 60°N. The island is 1,631.97 square miles (4,226.8 km^{2}) in area, making it the second-largest island in the Bering Sea and eighth-largest island in the United States. It is 76.2 kilometers (47.3 mi) long and 106 kilometers (66 mi) wide. It has a population of 191 persons as of the 2010 census, down from 210 in 2000. The island's entire population lives in the north coast city of Mekoryuk.

== People ==
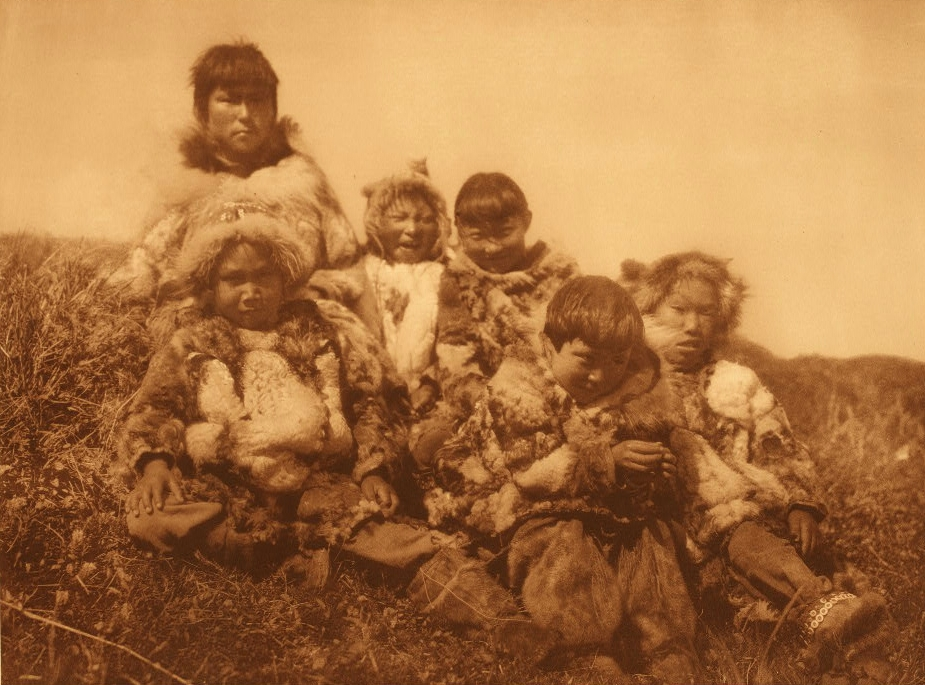
Nunivak children, photograph by Edward S. Curtis, 1930

Nunivak has only one permanent settlement, Mekoryuk, on the north shore, with about 200 residents. In the 1880 United States Census, Ivan Petrof recorded 702 residents in nine villages on the island. An epidemic in 1900 decimated the population of the island. Emigration keeps the population small. Noted persons who have visited Nunivak include journalist Jon Lee Anderson, photographer Edward S. Curtis, Anne Makepeace, anthropologist Margaret Lantis, and the artist Muriel Hannah. Noted conservationist and outdoorsman Steven Rinella aired an episode of his television show Meat Eater in 2015 where he experienced a muskox hunt and explored the history and culture of the island and its people.

Nearly all the permanent residents of Nunivak are Cup'it Eskimo, whose traditional language is a dialect of Central Alaskan Yup'ik known as Cup'ig or Nunivak Cup'ig. Cup'ig is the first language for many older islanders and is enjoying a dedicated revival among younger islanders as well, although nearly all Nuniwarmiut (Nunivak people) speak English. The people of Nunivak Island still depend to a large degree on subsistence hunting, and also commercial fishing and industrial work on the mainland.

== Geology and natural history ==
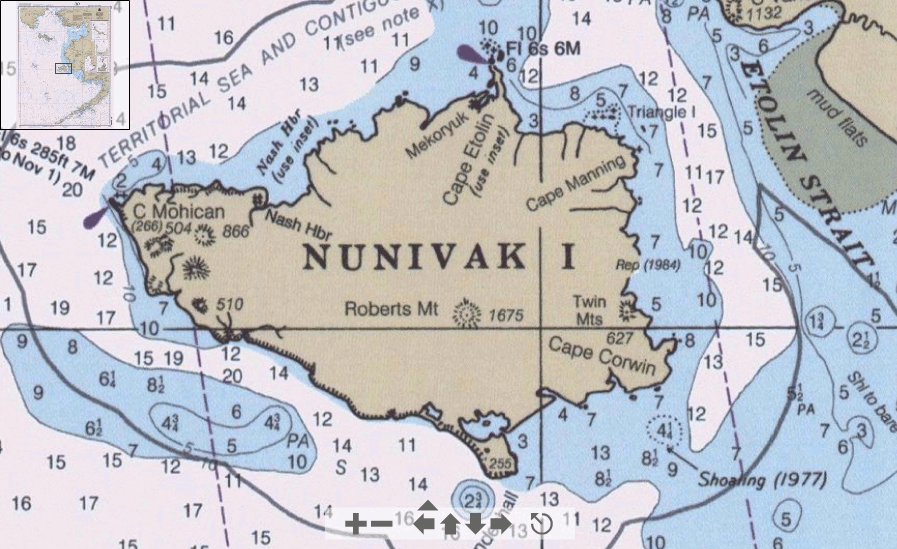
Nunivak – detail from a 2000 NOAA Bering Sea chart

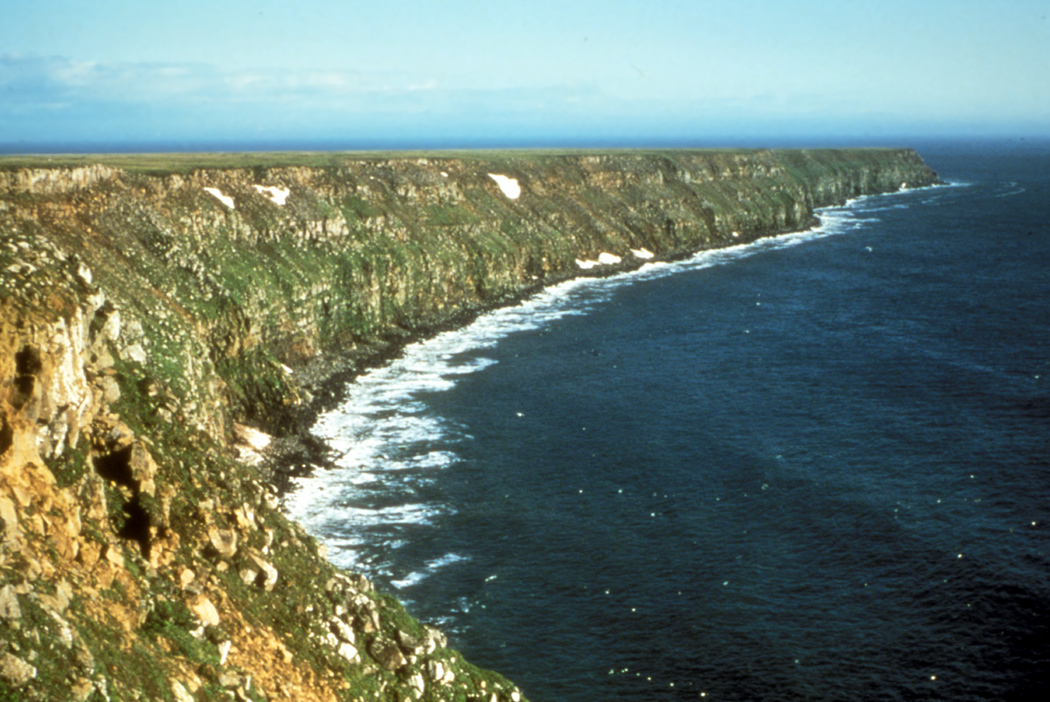
Bering Sea cliffs, Nunivak

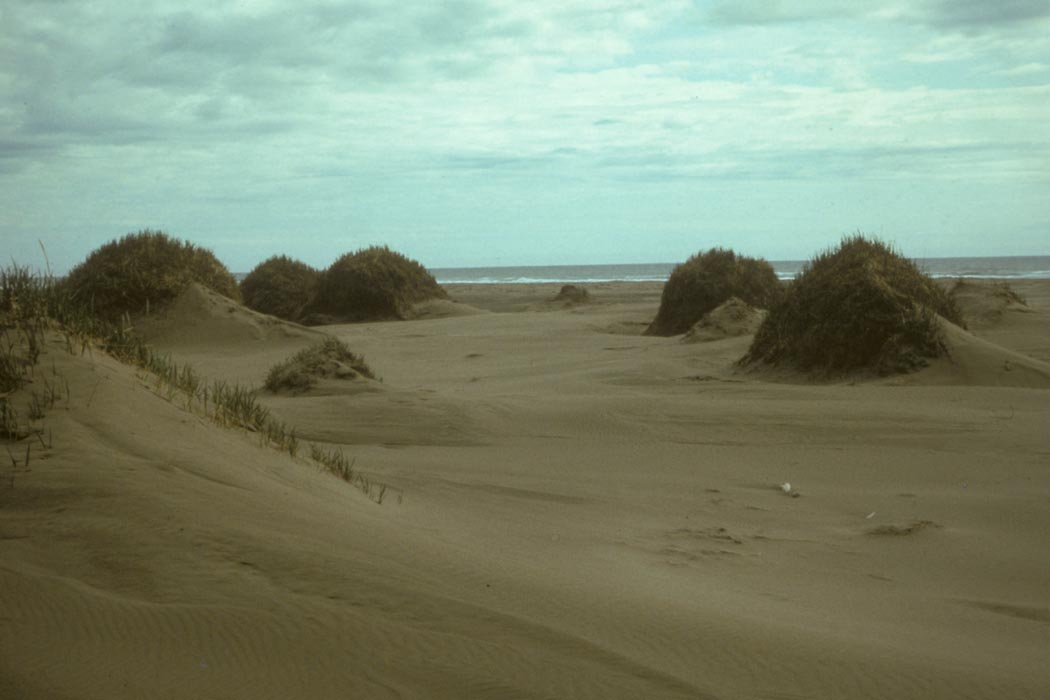
Sand dunes and vegetation, Nunivak Island

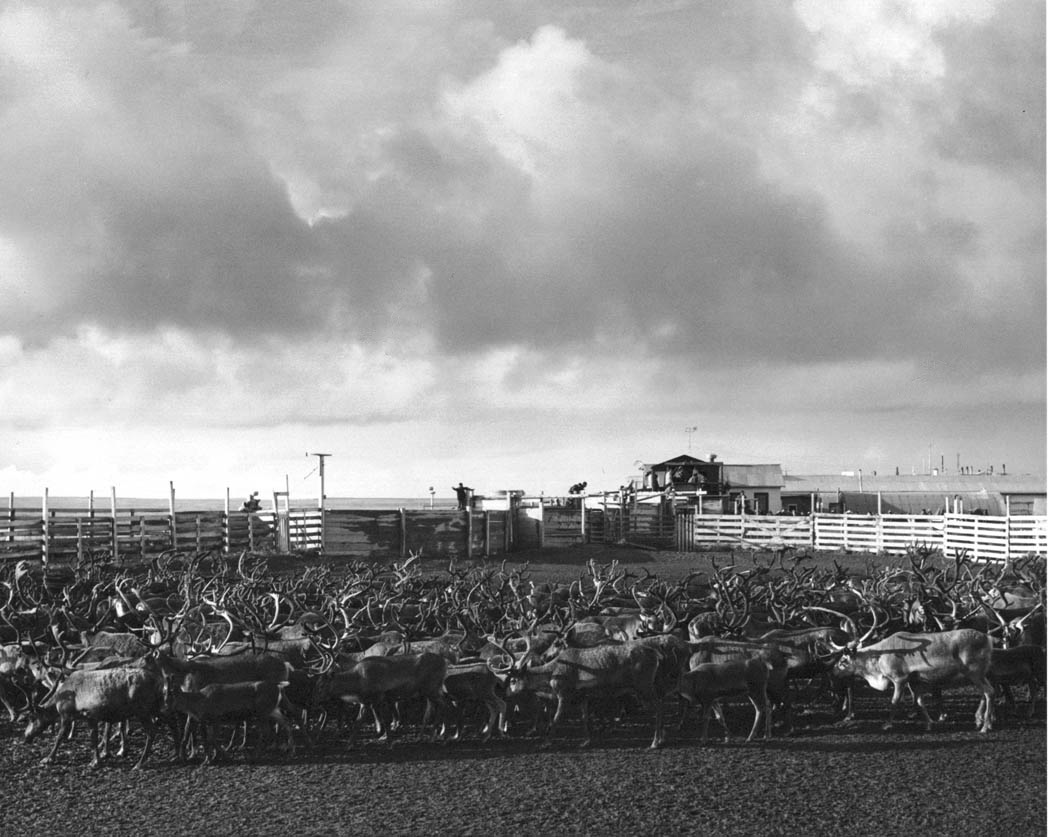
Reindeer roundup, June 1964

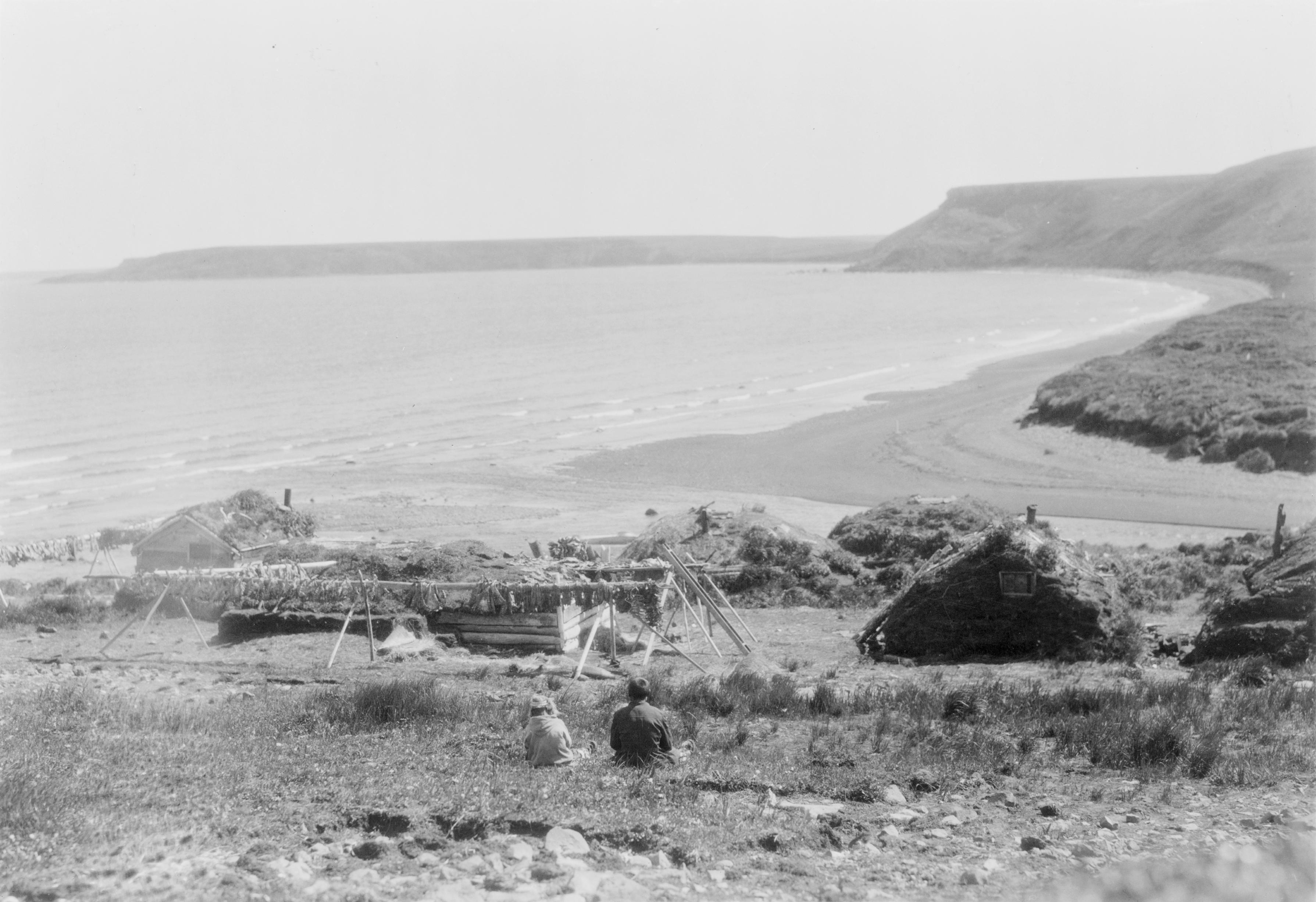
Nash Harbor, Nunivak; 1927 showing bay, houses, and the mouth of the Ellikarrmiut River

Nunivak Island is volcanic in origin; most of the island is dominated by volcanic plateau 500 ft (160 m) or more above sea level. The island is dotted with about 60 cinder cones and four maars. Much of its surface consists of widespread, thin flows of pahoehoe lava from small shield volcanoes, which spread over sedimentary rock of the Cretaceous period. Volcanic eruptions took place during 5 periods of activity beginning 6.1 million years ago. Most of the volcanic field was formed during the two most recent eruptive periods during the Pleistocene ending about 300,000 years ago. Because of the history of volcanic activity, it is considered part of the Bering Sea Volcanic Province. The Ibkilwit Lava Bed is located on Nunivak Island.

Tundra is the main landscape feature; the largest trees on Nunivak are dwarf willow trees, most less than 4 ft (1.2 m) tall. More than 40 rivers drain the tundra upland. Brackish lagoons ring the eastern and southern shores, and steep, volcanic cliffs dominate the northwest shores.

At least 89 migratory seabird and waterfowl species have seasonal homes on Nunivak Island, including several endangered and threatened species. Dense summer-breeding rookeries are found on all shores of the island, and in inland tundra lakes.

Prehistorically, Nunivak was home to a modest herd of caribou, but these were exterminated after the introduction of firearms in the late 19th and early 20th century. The United States Fish and Wildlife Service introduced reindeer (the smaller Eurasian caribou) and musk oxen onto the island in the 1930s and 1940s. Large herds of these animals are maintained by the local Native Corporation of Mekoryuk. The muskoxen are most valued for their wool, or qiviut, which is collected after the animals shed in springtime for spinning into yarn, with one skein sometimes selling for $100.

Most of the island is part of the Yukon Delta National Wildlife Refuge, administered by the U.S. Fish and Wildlife Service. The southern half of the island (600,000 acres) is protected as the Nunivak Wilderness.

== Culture ==
The art of Nunivak Island has its roots in the ancient past. The oldest known sculpture is thousands of years old.

In the ancient times masks were made to sell or trade for goods needed to survive. Later masks were intended for festivities, dances, and traditional healing.

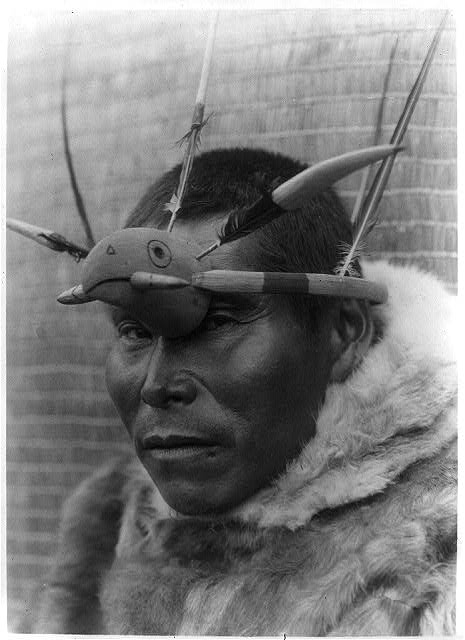
Maskette – Nunivak

This type of mask (there are many types of masks carved today) represents the life surrounding Nunivak Island. The walrus is what the loon depends on for survival. And, in turn, man depends on the loon and the walrus for survival. These are two of the traditional animals that were hunted by the men of the village in order to provide for their families.

The walrus is what the Nunivak peoples depended on to survive. It held much of the necessities of living in the Bering Sea. The skin of the walrus was used for waterproofing kayaks, the soles of mukluks (Cup'ig boots), and the intestine was used as waterproof rain gear that were of great necessity in earlier times. The bones were used as tools, the ivory for spear heads, and harpoon heads and carvings were made for trade. Also the loon pelts were transformed into beautiful winter coats that were also waterproof.

== Demographics ==
Historical population
Census	Pop.	Note	%±
1880	400		—
1910	127		—
1920	189		48.8%
1930	191		1.1%
1940	225		17.8%
1950	156		−30.7%
1960	242		55.1%
1970	249		2.9%
1980	160		−35.7%
1990	177		10.6%
2000	210		18.6%
2010	191		−9.0%
2020	206		7.9%
U.S. Decennial Census

Nunivak Island first reported on the 1880 U.S. Census as an unincorporated island, with 400 Yupik residents. In 1890, the villages on the island reported separately. It next reported in 1910 for the entire island through to 1940. Since 1950, any settlements on the island have reported separately again, though all residents now reside in Mekoryuk as of 2000 and 2010.

== Population ==
In 2004, 179 people lived on the island; According to the 2000 census, the population was 210. They all live in a single village called Mekoryuk, located on the north coast of Nunivak. During the 1880 US Census, 702 islanders in nine settlements were recorded. An epidemic in 1900 devastated the population of the island. The constant exodus of people prevents population growth. Although almost all local people in Nunivak speak English; they speak the Nunivak Chupik dialect of the central Yupik language. Preservation of the Chupik language, which is taught in schools, is underway. Islanders still rely on hunting, as well as commercial fishing and seasonal work on the mainland.

== See also ==
- Nunathloogagamiutbingoi Dunes
