= Mekoryuk, Alaska =

Mekoryuk Mikuryarmiut / Mikuryar
- City
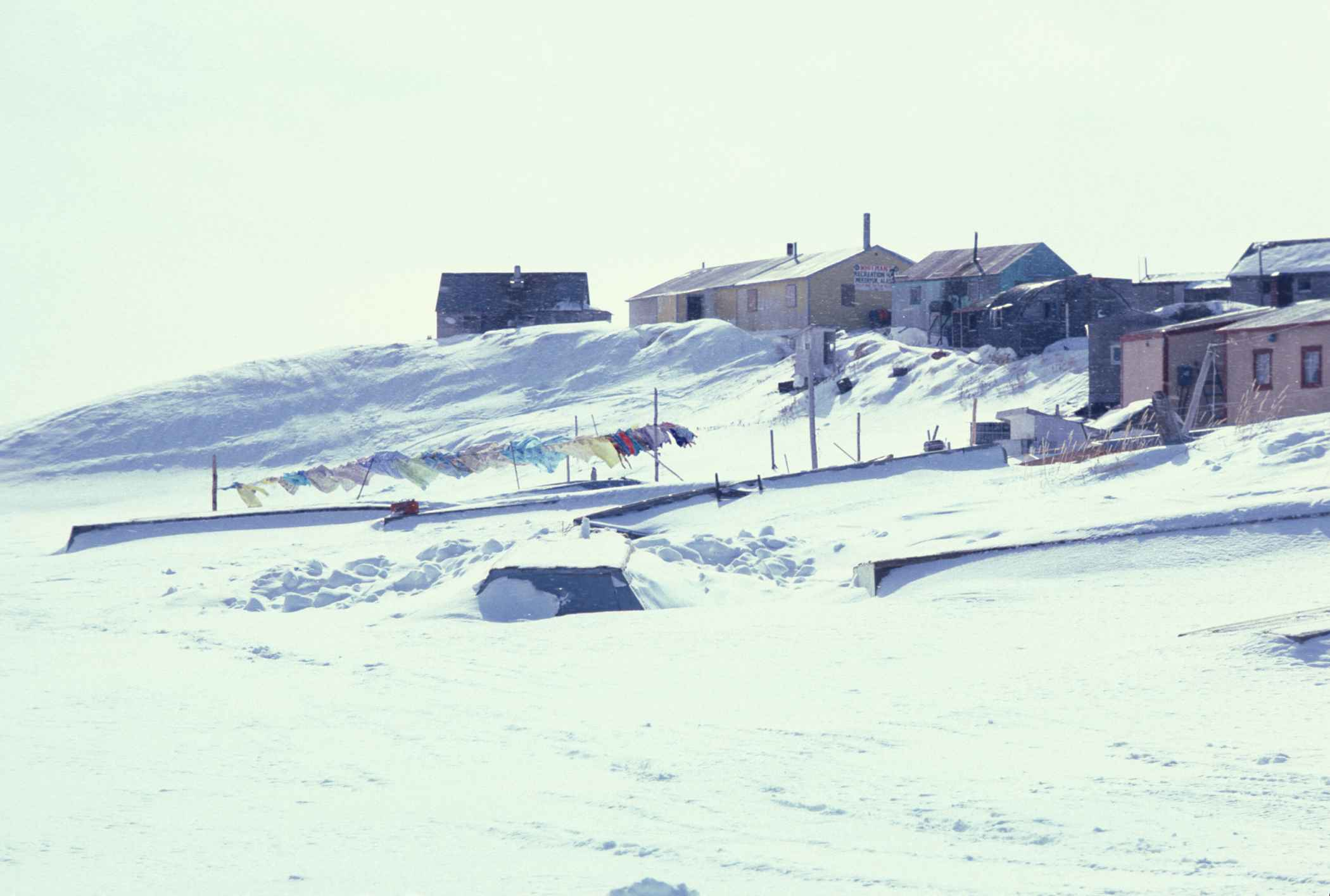
- Mekoryuk in 1978

- Location in Alaska
- Coordinates: 60°23′21″N 166°12′25″W
- Country: United States
- State: Alaska
- Census Area: Bethel
- Incorporated: September 24, 1969

Government
  - Mayor: Larry Nicholson
  - State senator: Lyman Hoffman (D)
  - State rep.: Nellie Jimmie (D)

Area
  - Total: 7.08 sq mi (18.34 km^{2})
  - Land: 7.07 sq mi (18.30 km^{2})
  - Water: 0.012 sq mi (0.03 km^{2})
- Elevation: 6.6 ft (2 m)

Population (2020)
  - Total: 206
  - Density: 29.1/sq mi (11.25/km^{2})
- Time zone: UTC-9 (Alaska (AKST))
  - Summer (DST): UTC-8 (AKDT)
- ZIP code: 99630
- Area code: 907
- FIPS code: 02-47990
- GNIS feature ID: 1406211

Mekoryuk (Nunivak Cup'ig: Mikuryarmiut; Central Yup'ik: Mikuryar) is a city located on Nunivak Island in the Bethel Census Area, Alaska, United States. As of the 2020 census, Mekoryuk had a population of 206.

== History ==
Nunivak Island has been inhabited for 2,000 years by the Nuniwarmiut, or Nunivak Cup'ig people.

The community's first contact with Europeans was in 1821 when explorers from the Russian-American Company arrived on their island. These Russians recorded 400 people living in 16 villages on the Nunivak Island.

While conducting the 1880 United States Census, Ivan Petrof recorded 702 Yup'ik in 9 villages, including 117 people at "Koot", near the site of present-day Mekoryuk. An epidemic in 1900 left only four surviving families in the village.

In the 1930s, the Evangelical Covenant Church was built at Mekoryuk, followed by a school in 1939. People moved to the village from other areas of the island to be near the school. Reindeer herding was introduced in 1920 by an Eskimo-Russian trader. The operation was purchased by the United States government in the 1940s and a slaughterhouse was built in 1945. The reindeer were crossed with caribou from Denali Park. The resulting animals were larger and less tame than other reindeer. 34 musk ox from Greenland were transferred to the Nunivak Island in 1934 in an effort to save the species from extinction. Today, the musk-ox herd numbers around 500, and calves from this herd have been relocated and introduced to other areas of Alaska.

In the mid-20th century, Mekoryuk became the only permanent population center on the island. Until the 1940s, the traditional lifestyle and traditional ceremonies and religious beliefs were practiced.

The 1950s and 1960s brought considerable change. Mekoryuk Airport was built in 1957. When the Territorial Guard was formed, men were sent to Fort Richardson near Anchorage for training. During this time, many families moved to Bethel during the winter to be near the high school, returning in the spring for fishing and sea mammal hunting. A high school was constructed in Mekoryuk in 1978.

== Geography ==
Mekoryuk is located at the mouth of Shoal Bay on the north shore of Nunivak Island in the Bering Sea. The island lies 48 km (30 mi) west of the Alaska coast. According to the United States Census Bureau, the city has a total area of 7.4 square miles (19 km^{2}), of which, 7.4 square miles (19 km^{2}) of it is land and 0.14% is water.

=== Climate ===
Mekoryuk has a tundra climate (Köppen: ET), that borders on a subarctic climate (Köppen: Dfc).

Climate data for Mekoryuk, Alaska
Month	Jan	Feb	Mar	Apr	May	Jun	Jul	Aug	Sep	Oct	Nov	Dec	Year
Record high °F (°C)	41 (5)	38 (3)	48 (9)	48 (9)	70 (21)	71 (22)	77 (25)	70 (21)	63 (17)	54 (12)	46 (8)	47 (8)	77 (25)
Mean daily maximum °F (°C)	19.2 (−7.1)	16.8 (−8.4)	21.1 (−6.1)	28.4 (−2.0)	38.6 (3.7)	47.8 (8.8)	53.7 (12.1)	54.5 (12.5)	50.0 (10.0)	39.0 (3.9)	30.4 (−0.9)	20.0 (−6.7)	35.0 (1.7)
Daily mean °F (°C)	12.1 (−11.1)	9.7 (−12.4)	13.6 (−10.2)	22.4 (−5.3)	34.0 (1.1)	42.5 (5.8)	48.4 (9.1)	49.6 (9.8)	45.3 (7.4)	34.5 (1.4)	25.4 (−3.7)	13.6 (−10.2)	29.3 (−1.5)
Mean daily minimum °F (°C)	5.0 (−15.0)	2.5 (−16.4)	6.0 (−14.4)	16.4 (−8.7)	29.3 (−1.5)	37.1 (2.8)	43.1 (6.2)	44.7 (7.1)	40.6 (4.8)	30.0 (−1.1)	20.3 (−6.5)	7.2 (−13.8)	23.5 (−4.7)
Record low °F (°C)	−35 (−37)	−30 (−34)	−30 (−34)	−12 (−24)	0 (−18)	27 (−3)	28 (−2)	23 (−5)	15 (−9)	9 (−13)	−18 (−28)	−39 (−39)	−39 (−39)
Average precipitation inches (mm)	0.86 (22)	0.83 (21)	1.11 (28)	0.87 (22)	0.55 (14)	0.81 (21)	1.44 (37)	2.12 (54)	2.23 (57)	1.72 (44)	1.31 (33)	1.14 (29)	14.99 (382)
Average snowfall inches (cm)	—	2.9 (7.4)	6.8 (17)	2.6 (6.6)	3.1 (7.9)	1.7 (4.3)	0.0 (0.0)	0.0 (0.0)	0.7 (1.8)	7.4 (19)	10.7 (27)	10.0 (25)	46.0 (117)
Source: WRCC

== Demographics ==
Historical population
Census	Pop.	Note	%±
1950	156		—
1960	242		55.1%
1970	249		2.9%
1980	160		−35.7%
1990	177		10.6%
2000	210		18.6%
2010	191		−9.0%
2020	206		7.9%
U.S. Decennial Census

Mekoryuk first appeared on the 1950 U.S. Census as "Mekoryok." It appeared as the current spelling in 1960. It was formally incorporated in 1969.

=== 2020 census ===
As of the 2020 census, Mekoryuk had a population of 206. The median age was 35.0 years. 28.6% of residents were under the age of 18 and 15.5% of residents were 65 years of age or older. For every 100 females there were 121.5 males, and for every 100 females age 18 and over there were 137.1 males age 18 and over.

0.0% of residents lived in urban areas, while 100.0% lived in rural areas.

There were 72 households in Mekoryuk, of which 41.7% had children under the age of 18 living in them. Of all households, 36.1% were married-couple households, 36.1% were households with a male householder and no spouse or partner present, and 22.2% were households with a female householder and no spouse or partner present. About 23.6% of all households were made up of individuals and 11.1% had someone living alone who was 65 years of age or older.

There were 95 housing units, of which 24.2% were vacant. The homeowner vacancy rate was 0.0% and the rental vacancy rate was 4.5%.

Racial composition as of the 2020 census
Race	Number	Percent
White	9	4.4%
Black or African American	0	0.0%
American Indian and Alaska Native	193	93.7%
Asian	1	0.5%
Native Hawaiian and Other Pacific Islander	0	0.0%
Some other race	0	0.0%
Two or more races	3	1.5%
Hispanic or Latino (of any race)	1	0.5%

=== 2000 census ===
As of the 2000 census, there were 210 people, 73 households, and 48 families residing in the city. The population density was 28.5 inhabitants per square mile (11.0/km^{2}). There were 96 housing units at an average density of 13.0 units per square mile (5.0 units/km^{2}). The racial makeup of the city was 3.33% White, 90.48% Native American, and 6.19% from two or more races. 0.48% of the population were Hispanic or Latino of any race.

There were 73 households, out of which 31.5% had children under the age of 18 living with them, 45.2% were married couples living together, 15.1% had a female householder with no husband present, and 34.2% were non-families. 32.9% of all households were made up of individuals, and 2.7% had someone living alone who was 65 years of age or older. The average household size was 2.88 and the average family size was 3.77.

In the city, the age distribution of the population shows 32.4% under the age of 18, 6.7% from 18 to 24, 29.0% from 25 to 44, 22.4% from 45 to 64, and 9.5% who were 65 years of age or older. The median age was 36 years. For every 100 females, there were 116.5 males. For every 100 females age 18 and over, there were 136.7 males.

The median income for a household in the city was $30,833, and the median income for a family was $33,750. Males had a median income of $25,417 versus $11,667 for females. The per capita income for the city was $11,958. About 13.7% of families and 21.9% of the population were below the poverty line, including 36.7% of those under the age of eighteen and 15.8% of those 65 or over.

== Education ==
Lower Kuskokwim School District operates the Nuniwarmiut School, K-12. In 1984 the building was constructed.

== Health ==
Sale, importation and possession of alcohol are banned in the village.
