= USS Petrof Bay =

Casablanca-class escort carrier of the U.S. Navy

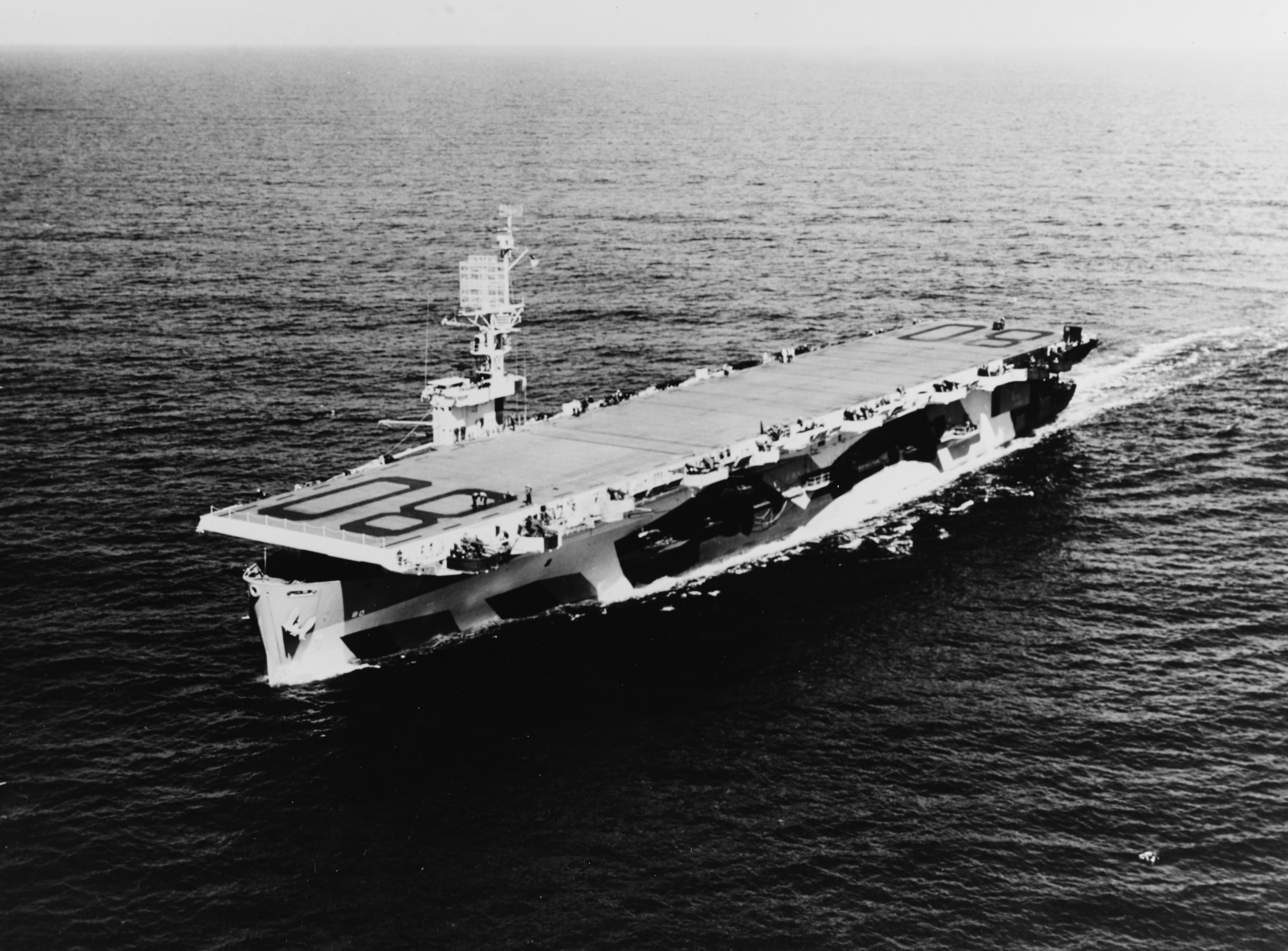
- USS Petrof Bay underway on 21 June 1944. She is painted in Camouflage Measure 33, Design 10A.

History

United States
- Name: Petrof Bay
- Namesake: Petrof Bay, Kuiu Island, Alaska
- Ordered: as a Type S4-S2-BB3 hull, MC hull 1117
- Awarded: 18 June 1942
- Builder: Kaiser Shipyards
- Laid down: 15 October 1943
- Launched: 5 January 1944
- Commissioned: 18 February 1944
- Decommissioned: 31 July 1946
- Stricken: 27 June 1958
- Identification: Hull symbol: CVE-80
- Honors and awards: 5 Battle stars
- Fate: Scrapped in September 1959

General characteristics
- Class & type: Casablanca-class escort carrier
- Displacement: 8,188 long tons (8,319 t) (standard); 10,902 long tons (11,077 t) (full load)
- Length: 512 ft 3 in (156.13 m) (oa); 490 ft (150 m) (wl); 474 ft (144 m) (fd)
- Beam: 65 ft 2 in (19.86 m); 108 ft (33 m) (extreme width)
- Draft: 20 ft 9 in (6.32 m) (max)
- Installed power: 4 × Babcock & Wilcox boilers; 9,000 shp (6,700 kW)
- Propulsion: 2 × Skinner Unaflow reciprocating steam engines; 2 × screws
- Speed: 19 knots (35 km/h; 22 mph)
- Range: 10,240 nmi (18,960 km; 11,780 mi) at 15 kn (28 km/h; 17 mph)
- Complement: Total: 910 – 916 officers and men; Embarked Squadron: 50 – 56; Ship's Crew: 860
- Armament: As designed: 1 × 5 in (127 mm)/38 cal dual-purpose gun; 4 × twin 40 mm (1.57 in) Bofors anti-aircraft guns; 12 × 20 mm (0.79 in) Oerlikon anti-aircraft cannons; Varied, ultimate armament: 1 × 5 in (127 mm)/38 cal dual-purpose gun; 8 × twin 40 mm (1.57 in) Bofors anti-aircraft guns; 20 × 20 mm (0.79 in) Oerlikon anti-aircraft cannons
- Aircraft carried: 27
- Aviation facilities: 1 × catapult; 2 × elevators

Service record
- Part of: United States Pacific Fleet (1944–1946); Atlantic Reserve Fleet (1946-1958)
- Operations: Mariana and Palau Islands campaign; Philippines campaign; Battle of Leyte; Battle off Samar; Invasion of Lingayen Gulf; Battle of Iwo Jima; Battle of Okinawa; Operation Magic Carpet

USS Petrof Bay (CVE-80) was the twenty-sixth of fifty Casablanca-class escort carriers built for the United States Navy during World War II. She was named after Petrof Bay, which in turn was named in 1928 after Ivan Petroff, a Russian Alaskan who served as a special census agent for the 1880 United States census. The bay is located within Kuiu Island, which at the time was a part of the Territory of Alaska. The ship was launched in January 1944, commissioned in February, and served in support of the Mariana and Palau Islands campaign, the Philippines campaign, including the Battle off Samar, the Battle of Iwo Jima, and the Battle of Okinawa. She was decommissioned in July 1946, when she was mothballed in the Atlantic Reserve Fleet. Postwar, she participated in Operation Magic Carpet. Ultimately, she was broken up in September 1959.

== Design and description ==
A side profile of the design of Thetis Bay.

Petrof Bay was a Casablanca-class escort carrier, the most numerous type of aircraft carriers ever built. Built to stem heavy losses during the Battle of the Atlantic, they came into service in late 1943, by which time the U-boat threat was already in retreat. Although some did see service in the Atlantic, the majority were utilized in the Pacific, ferrying aircraft, providing logistics support, and conducting close air support for the island-hopping campaigns. The Casablanca-class carriers were built on the standardized Type S4-S2-BB3 hull, a lengthened variant of the Doyen-class hull, and specifically designed to be mass-produced using welded prefabricated sections. This allowed them to be produced at unprecedented speeds: the final ship of her class, Munda, was delivered to the Navy just 101 days after the laying of her keel.

Petrof Bay was 512 ft 3 in (156.13 m) long overall (490 ft (150 m) at the waterline), had a beam of 65 ft 2 in (19.86 m), and a draft of 20 ft 9 in (6.32 m). She displaced 8,188 long tons (8,319 t) standard, which increased to 10,902 long tons (11,077 t) with a full load. To carry out flight operations, the ship had a 257 ft (78 m) hangar deck and a 474 ft (144 m) flight deck. Her compact size necessitated the installation of an aircraft catapult at her bow, and there were two aircraft elevators to facilitate movement of aircraft between the flight and hangar deck: one each fore and aft.

She was powered by four Babcock & Wilcox Express D boilers that raised 285 psi (1,970 kPa) of steam at 577 °F (303 °C). The steam generated by these boilers fed two Skinner Unaflow reciprocating steam engines, delivering 9,000 hp (6,700 kW) to two propeller shafts. This allowed her to reach speeds of 19 kn (35 km/h; 22 mph), with a cruising range of 10,240 nmi (18,960 km; 11,780 mi) at 15 kn (28 km/h; 17 mph). For armament, one 5 in (127 mm)/38 caliber dual-purpose gun was mounted on the stern. Additional anti-aircraft defense was provided by eight Bofors 40 mm (1.57 in) anti-aircraft guns in single mounts and twelve Oerlikon 20 mm (0.79 in) cannons mounted around the perimeter of the deck. By 1945, Casablanca-class carriers had been modified to carry twenty Oerlikon cannons and sixteen Bofors guns; the doubling of the latter was accomplished by putting them into twin mounts. Sensors onboard consisted of a SG surface-search radar and a SK air-search radar.

Although Casablanca-class escort carriers were intended to function with a crew of 860 and an embarked squadron of 50 to 56, the exigencies of wartime often necessitated the inflation of the crew count. They were designed to operate with 27 aircraft, but the hangar deck could accommodate much more during transport or training missions.

During the Mariana and Palau Islands campaign, she carried 16 FM-2 Wildcat fighters and 10 TBM-1C Avenger torpedo bombers for a total of 26 aircraft. However, during the Battle of Leyte, at the opening stages of the Philippines campaign, she carried 16 FM-2 fighters and 12 TBM-1C torpedo bombers for a total of 28 aircraft. During the Invasion of Lingayen Gulf, at the middle stages of the Philippines campaign, as well as during the Battle of Iwo Jima, she carried 20 FM-2 fighters and 12 TBM-1C torpedo bombers for a total of 32 aircraft. During the Battle of Okinawa, she carried 18 FM-2 fighters and 12 TBM-3 torpedo bombers for a total of 30 aircraft.

== Construction ==
Her construction was awarded to Kaiser Shipbuilding Company, Vancouver, Washington under a Maritime Commission contract, on 18 June 1942. The escort carrier was laid down on 15 October 1943 under the name Petrof Bay, as part of a tradition which named escort carriers after bays or sounds in Alaska. She was laid down as MC hull 1117, the twenty-sixth of a series of fifty Casablanca-class escort carriers. She therefore received the classification symbol CVE-80, indicating that she was the eightieth escort carrier to be commissioned into the United States Navy. She was launched on 5 January 1944; sponsored by Mrs. J.G. Atkins, the wife of Captain Atkins, the executive officer of the Farragut Naval Training Station, located in Northern Idaho; transferred to the Navy and commissioned on 18 February 1944, with Captain Joseph Lester Kane in command.

== Service history ==
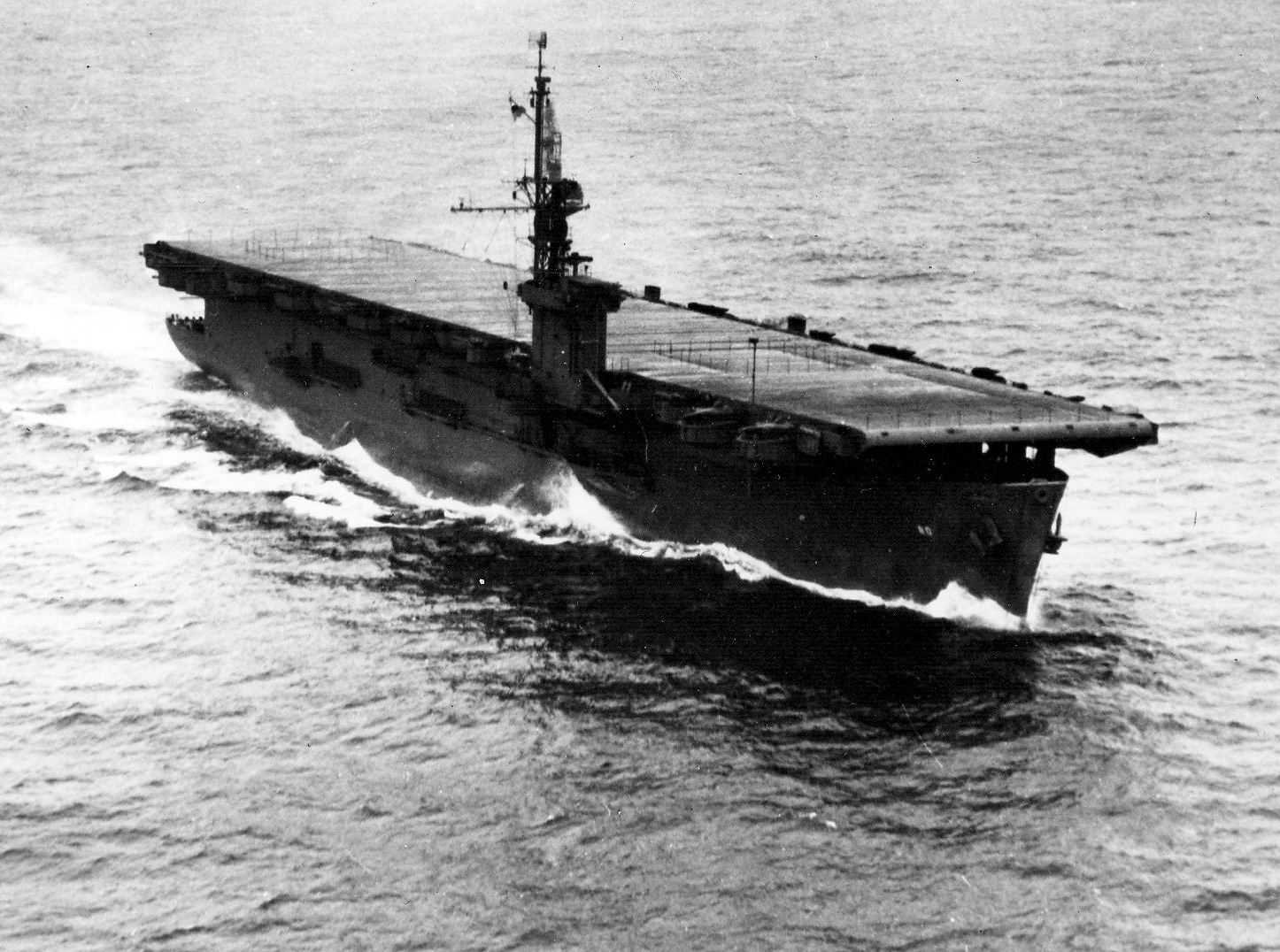
Petrof Bay is photographed proceeding down the West Coast on 18 March 1944.

Upon being commissioned, Petrof Bay underwent a shakedown cruise down the West Coast, heading to Naval Air Station North Island, San Diego, California. Upon arriving, she took on passengers, aircraft, and cargo, before departing on 29 March for the southwest Pacific. She arrived at Espiritu Santo of the New Hebrides on 14 April, where she unloaded part of her cargo. On 20 April, she steamed for Seeadler Harbor, in Manus Island of the Admiralty Islands, arriving there on 25 April. After arriving, she transferred eight aircraft that she was ferrying to other ships within the harbor.

On the morning of 29 April, Petrof Bay met with the Fast Carrier Task Force (Task Force 58) of the Fifth Fleet, whereupon she began providing replacement aircraft to the task force in preparation for a follow-up strike against the Japanese naval stronghold of Truk of the Caroline Islands, which had previously been heavily damaged in Operation Hailstone. She then headed to Majuro Atoll of the Marshall Islands, arriving on 3 May, where she replenished. She then rendezvoused with the Fast Carrier Task Force again, after it had successfully conducted its strike, providing all of her aircraft, as well as most of her aviation spares and material to the fleet carriers. She also loaded onboard damaged or obsolete aircraft, as well as salvage equipment for transportation back to the West Coast.

Accompanied by the Bogue-class escort carrier Barnes and three screening destroyers, Petrof Bay headed back to the West Coast on 7 May, sailing into the San Francisco Bay on 20 May. She then headed back down to San Diego, where she embarked Composite Squadron (VC) 76, commanded by Lieutenant Commander James W. McCauley, and which was to be assigned to become her combat air contingent. She initially conducted shakedown air operations with her newly embarked squadron, before heading westwards for Pearl Harbor on 30 July, arriving there on 6 August.

=== Marianas and Palau Islands campaign ===
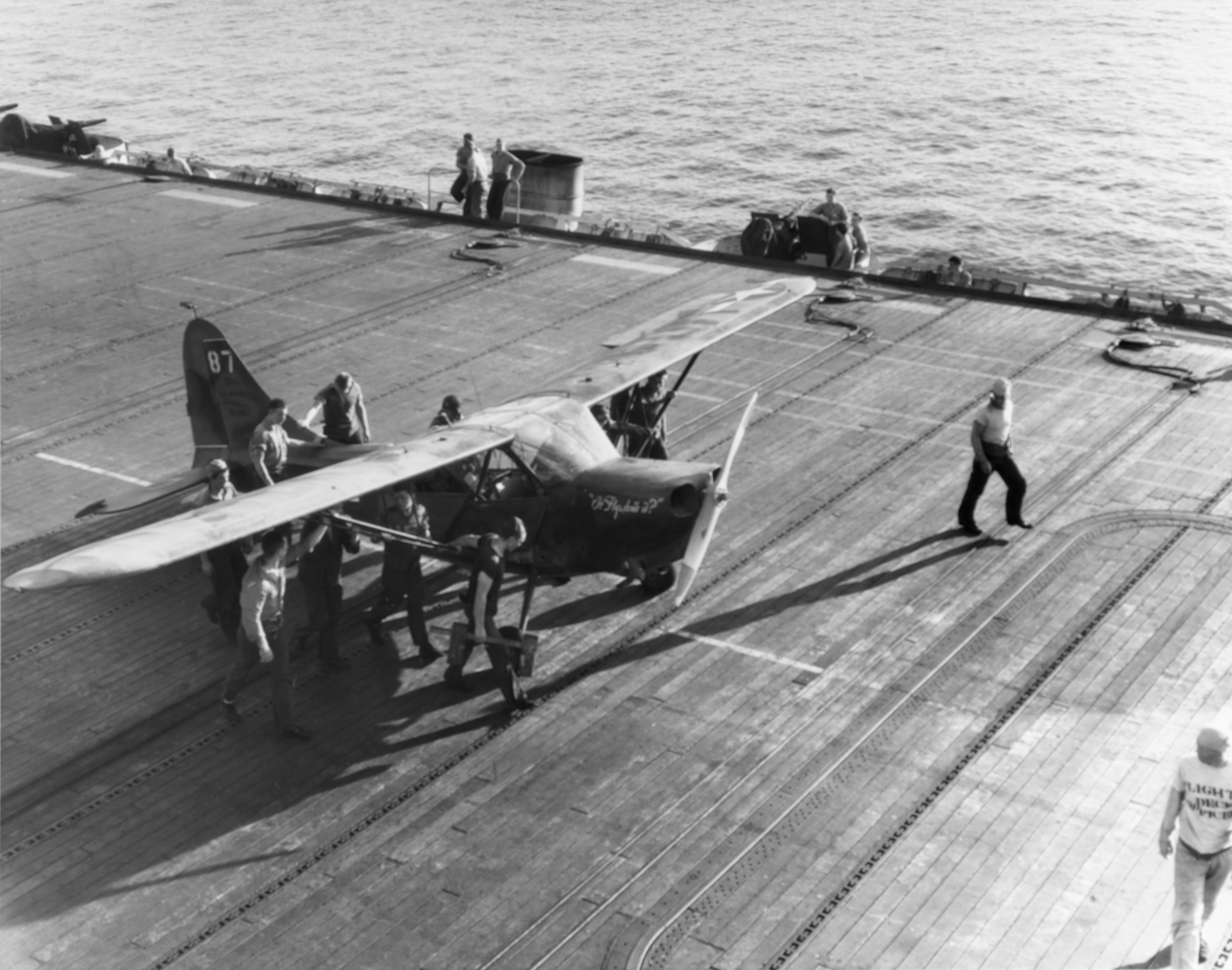
A U.S. Marines Air Corps Stinson OY-1 aerial reconnaissance plane is photographed onboard the flight deck of Petrof Bay on 19 September 1944, during the Marianas and Palau Islands campaign.

At Pearl Harbor, Petrof Bay disembarked her excess aircraft, and on 12 August, she left port, as a part of Task Group 32, the Western Attack Group, assigned to the Mariana and Palau Islands campaign, but more specifically, to the planned Battle of Peleliu, codenamed Operation Stalemate II. She first headed to Guadalcanal of the Solomon Islands, anchoring in Tulagi Harbor on the afternoon of 24 August. On 4 September, having been assigned to Task Unit 32.7.2, or "Taffy 3", commanded by Rear Admiral George R. Henderson along with her sisters Saginaw Bay, which was Henderson's flagship, and Kalinin Bay, she sortied for the western Caroline Islands as a part of the Peleliu and Anguar Movement Group Number 2, screened by the Fletcher-class destroyers Haggard, Hailey, Johnston, and the Gleaves-class destroyer Welles.

Petrof Bay, upon arriving off of Peleliu on 15 September, immediately began launching strikes against Japanese positions on the island. Marines of the 1st Marine Division landed on the southwest beaches of the island on the morning of 15 September, with the aircraft of VC-76 providing crucial close air support as they advanced up the island. For example, on the late afternoon of 15 September, as the Japanese garrison massed for a counterattack, a VC-76 TBM dropped a 500 lb (230 kg) bomb in the midst of three tanks, putting all three out of action. Her aircraft continued supporting the Marines almost continuously until 29 September, with the exception of one day when she replenished on munitions at Kossol Roads. Notably, her aircraft were allowed almost free rein over the island, with the beleaguered Japanese forces in the area never providing any air opposition. By 30 September, the airfield on the island had become operational, enabling the use of land-based aircraft, and therefore Petrof Bay retired back to Manus Island.

=== Philippines campaign ===
Whilst at Manus Island, Petrof Bay was assigned to Task Unit 77.4.1, or "Taffy 1" of Task Group 77.4, the Escort Carrier Group. Commanded by Rear Admiral Thomas L. Sprague, it consisted of the Sangamon-class escort carriers Sangamon, which was Sprague's flagship, Suwannee, Chenango, Santee, as well as the Casablanca-class escort carriers Saginaw Bay and Petrof Bay in Carrier Division 28, subdivided from the other carriers, but still within the same task unit. Carrier Division 28 was commanded by Rear Admiral George R. Henderson, whose flag was still hoisted onboard Saginaw Bay. On 14 October, she sortied from Seeadler Harbor, headed for Leyte Gulf in support of the opening landings on Leyte, which was to be the return of American forces to the Philippines, and which would also begin the Philippines campaign.

As the escort carriers snaked northwards from the Admiralty Islands, they provided air cover and screening for the troop transports underway. Petrof Bay and Saginaw Bay were assigned to escort the transports of Task Group 79.3, which was carrying the troops of the 7th Infantry Division, which was bound to land near Dulag, near the southern flank of the planned initial beachhead. On 20 October, having finished her task of escorting the attack transports, she separated from the rest of "Taffy 1" and rendezvoused with Task Unit 77.4.2, or "Taffy 2" for the initial landings, as "Taffy 2" was responsible for covering the landing of the 7th Infantry Division. Between the two carriers, they made forty air sorties on 20 October, as the 7th Infantry landed on Leyte. She then detached from "Taffy 2" and rejoined "Taffy 1", which had been suffering from Japanese air attacks. Petrof Bay continued providing air support from 21 October to 24 October.

In the meantime, as the escort carriers conducted their strikes, the Japanese garrison on Suluan had managed to alert their command, triggering Admiral Soemu Toyoda to launch Shō-Gō 1, a gambit to defend Japan's access to the oil fields of Southeast Asia. On 24 October, news began filtering through of the Japanese fleet moving out to engage, in what was to be the Battle of Leyte Gulf. Petrof Bay, having rejoined "Taffy 1" (Saginaw Bay had transferred her aircraft contingent to other carriers and retired from the field on 24 October), was located in the southernmost group of the escort carriers, just east of Surigao City. With this news, VC-76 began rearming into a complement more suitable to fighting against surface ships, with Captain Kane ordering all of her TBM Avengers to be loaded with torpedoes, of which they would dearly need the following day.

Over the night of 25 October, Vice Admiral Takeo Kurita's Center Force swung through the San Bernardino Strait, confronting and catching "Taffy 3", the northernmost escort carrier group, by surprise as the sun rose. The Center Force had previously been sighted and attacked by aircraft in the Sibuyan Sea, and had been thought to be withdrawing, information which had certainly played into Admiral William Halsey Jr.'s decision to lead his Third Fleet northwards, after spotting Vice Admiral Jisaburō Ozawa's diversionary Northern Force. Thus, the only ships covering the vulnerable landing crafts of Leyte Gulf were the three escort carrier task groups and their screens.

At 06:47, on the morning of 25 October, "Taffy 3" radioed for help, reporting that they were being attacked by a large Japanese surface force. Therefore, "Taffy 1" and "Taffy 2" launched aircraft in relief. As a part of this action, Petrof Bay launched two special strikes against the Center Force, with the first special strike consisting of eight FM-2 Wildcats, which linked with aircraft from Santee and Sangamon to strafe the Japanese fleet. The Wildcats made strafing runs against the Japanese ships, to little effect, and released their bombs, to unknown effect (heavy anti-aircraft fire made immediate observation extremely precarious). Two of her Wildcats were lost in this action, one of them to friendly anti-aircraft fire as it tried to return to Petrof Bay over Tacloban, and another to the flak of the Japanese fleet as it made a run.

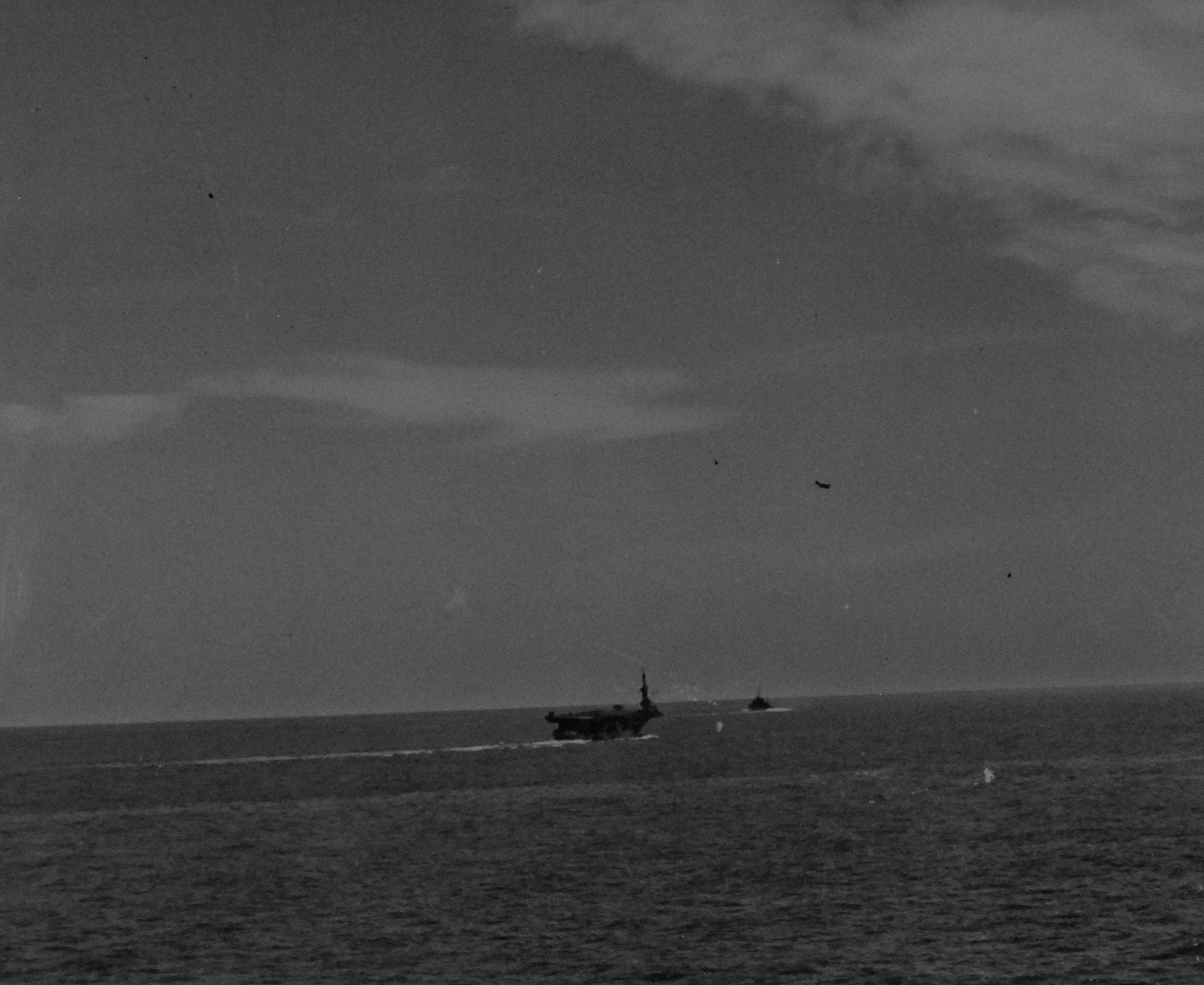
A Yokosuka D4Y dive bomber, diving from the port side, misses with its bomb, which splashes to the starboard side of Petrof Bay, 25 October 1944, photographed onboard Suwannee.

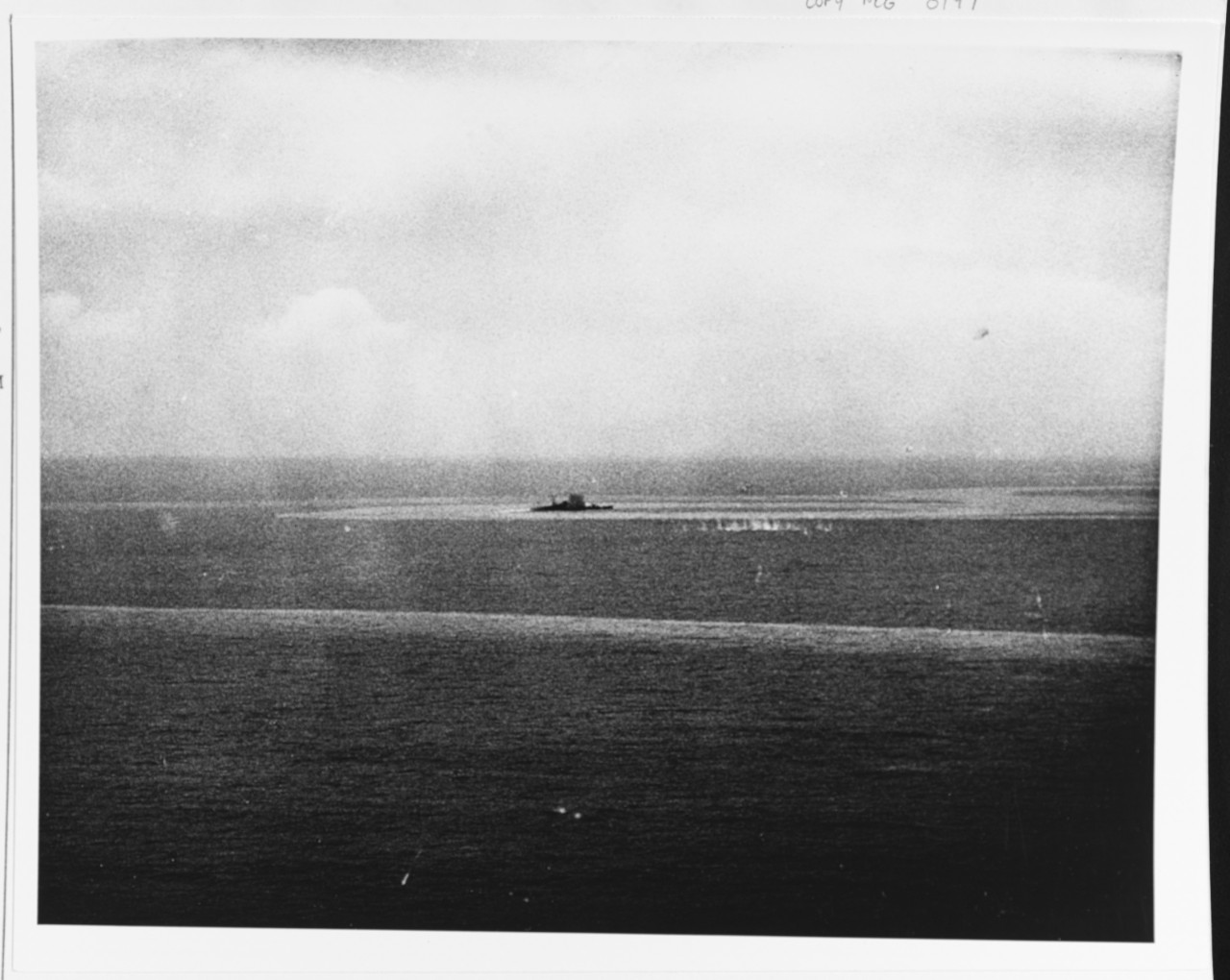
In this photograph taken from one of Composite Squadron (VC) 76's aircraft, an unidentified Tone-class cruiser of the Center Force is shown firing against attacking planes on 25 October 1944. Note the splashes distributed throughout the water.

In the meantime, the second special strike of "Taffy 1" organized, consisting of forty-one planes, coming into formation at around 07:25. Amongst this contingent were four FM-2 Wildcats and six TBM-1C Avengers launched by Petrof Bay. Immediately after these planes had been launched, at 07:29, radar detected six Japanese Mitsubishi A6M "Zeros" approaching "Taffy 1". As a result, the crew of Petrof Bay were immediately called to general quarters, and would remain so for the next 108 hours. These six planes carried out the first organized kamikaze attacks to take place in the course of the Pacific War. (Note: George Hermon Gill claims that HMAS Canberra was the first Allied ship to be hit by a kamikaze, but this is disputed by Samuel Eliot Morison, who asserts that Canberra was a target of opportunity, and that the kamikazes of the Battle off Samar represented the first organized attack.) At 07:40, visual contact was made with four of the Zeroes, which were proceeding some 10,000 ft (3,000 m) above the carriers. Three of the kamikazes immediately began their dives, with the fourth loitering around before selecting a target. The first kamikaze struck Santee, and the second kamikaze was shot down just short of Sangamon, spraying shrapnel all over the carrier. The third kamikaze dove towards Petrof Bay, but was shot down by her anti-aircraft guns as it made its dive. Nonetheless, it crashed into the ocean near enough to send water splashing onto her flight deck. The fourth kamikaze, having chosen its target, dove and struck Suwanee. A few minutes later, Santee was hit by a torpedo fired from the Japanese submarine I-56.

In the chaos following the immediate aftermath of the kamikaze attacks, a Yokosuka D4Y "Judy" dive bomber dove out of the cloud cover to the port side of Petrof Bay, catching the carrier's crew by surprise. The aircraft strafed the carrier as it dove, and released its bomb unmolested by anti-aircraft fire, which still missed to the carrier's starboard. Thereafter, it disengaged and flew off.

At 09:10, having been delayed considerably by kamikazes attempting to harry "Taffy 1", the special strike group proceeded northwards, reaching the vicinity of the battle at around 10:00. By then, Kurita had been discouraged by the American resistance, and was withdrawing eastwards. Petrof Bay's Avengers made torpedo runs against the battleships Kongō, Haruna, and Nagato, with two Avengers even attempting to strike the largest battleship ever launched, the super battleship Yamato. The crew of VC-76 reported one probable hit on Yamato, two probable hits on Nagato, two hits on Kongō, as well as one hit on an unidentified cruiser. However, the veracity of these claims are certainly dubitable, considering that the Japanese never recorded said torpedo "hits".

In the meantime, her Wildcats strafed the Japanese fleet, with apparent greater success than during the first special strike. Remarkably, despite the limited damage inflicted by the second special strike, none of her aircraft were lost to enemy fire. However, as they proceeded back from their strikes, the returning aircraft were dangerously low on fuel. Some of her Wildcats diverted to Tacloban, where they were harried by friendly anti-aircraft fire. In addition, some of her Avengers diverted to Fanshaw Bay of "Taffy 3" and Ommaney Bay of "Taffy 2", with one of her Avengers landing with less than 10 US gal (38 L; 8.3 imp gal) of fuel remaining. Four of her aircraft opted to try to return to Petrof Bay, the two Avengers that had made their run against Yamato, as well as two Wildcats. Three of those aircraft landed on her flight deck successfully, with one of the Avengers being forced to ditch into the ocean within sight of the carrier.

At 15:30, Petrof Bay launched a final strike to harass the retreating Center Force. After rendezvousing with the other aircraft of "Taffy 1", the aircraft proceed to the San Bernardino Strait, where it encountered the Mogami-class cruiser Kumano, whereupon her Avengers made torpedo runs against the cruiser. The apparently overeager pilots recorded two torpedo hits and one probable torpedo hit, when in reality the cruiser suffered only minor damage. Her final strike was forced to also divert to Tacloban, as their fuel was insufficient to return to "Taffy 1". Thus, Petrof Bay was left with only two Avengers onboard.

At 22:37, "Taffy 1" was steaming towards a rendezvous with "Taffy 3", when one of its escorts, the Buckley-class destroyer escort Coolbaugh, sighted the feathery wake of a submarine's periscope perpendicular to the escort carriers. As Coolbaugh charged in towards the wake to deliver depth charges, with inconclusive results, the rest of the fleet conducted an immediate 90-degree emergency turn. As the turn was completed, the crew of Petrof Bay spotted two torpedo wakes straddling the carrier, one 20 yd (18 m) to the portside, and another apparently coasting under the overhang on the starboard side.

Whilst the American forces had been distracted with the Battle off Samar and its immediate aftermath, Vice Admiral Naomasa Sakonju's transport unit, which consisted of the Nagara-class light cruiser Kinu, the Fubuki-class destroyer Uranami, as well as four transports were in the process of unloading 2,000 troops onto Ormoc Bay, on the Western coast of Leyte. The transport unit had also previously included the Aoba-class cruiser Aoba, but after having been damaged by the Gato-class submarine Bream on 23 October, it withdrew westwards. The transport unit finished unloading its troops on the morning of 26 October, but as it withdrew, it was quickly sighted. Therefore, a strike group of twenty-three Avengers and twenty-nine fighters were assembled to strike the Japanese ships. Petrof Bay contributed its last two Avengers to the strike group, and the strike group reached the Japanese ships at 10:00 in the morning. One of Petrof Bay's Avengers scored a hit with a 500-pound (230 kg) semi-armor-piercing bomb on Kinu, which sank shortly afterwards. In addition, her fighters strafed Uranami, contributing to her sinking.

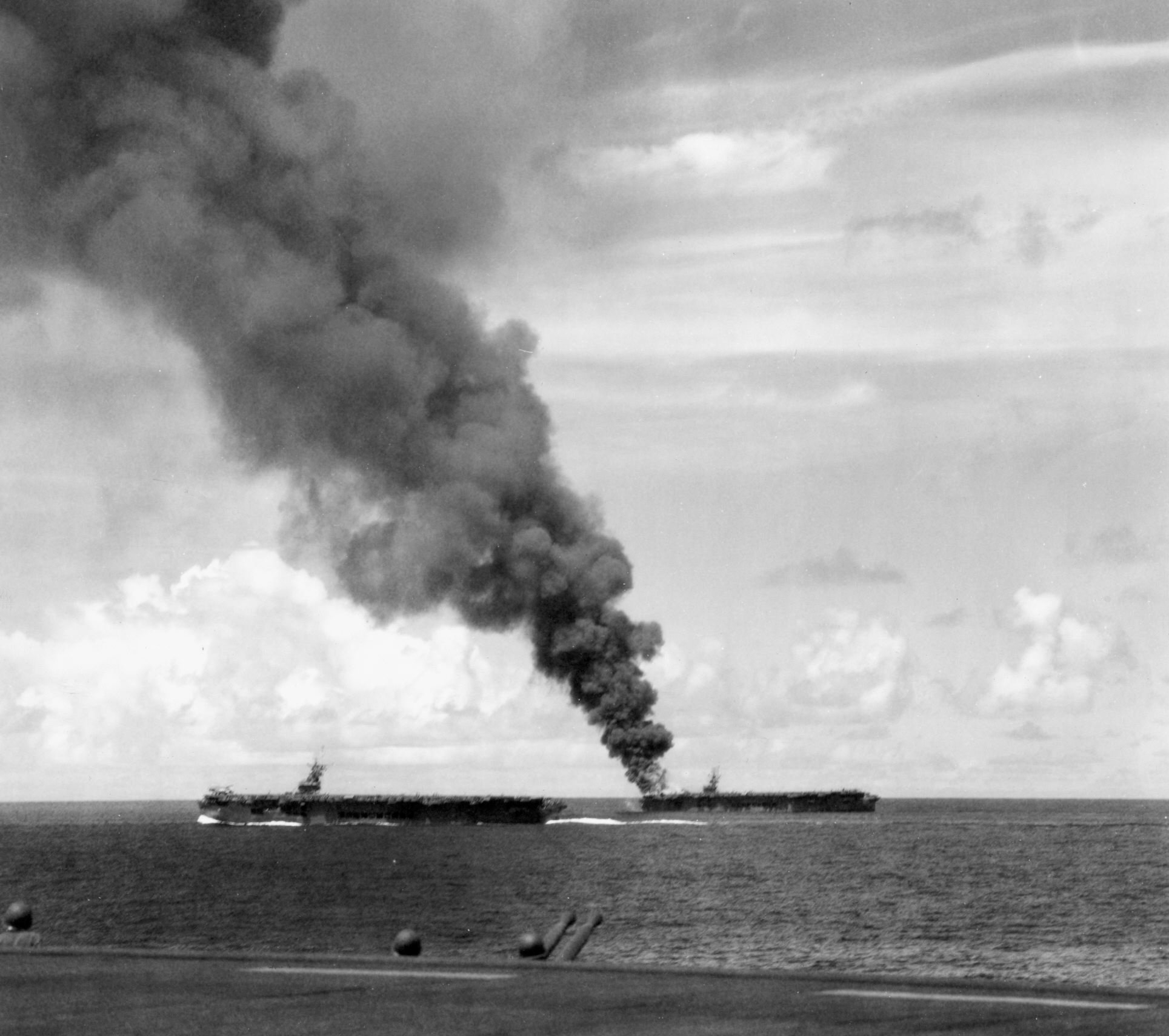
In a photograph likely taken onboard the flight deck of Petrof Bay, the escort carriers Santee and Suwannee are depicted. The burning carrier is Suwannee, which had been previously hit by two kamikazes.

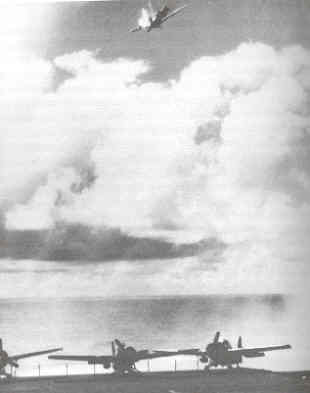
A kamikaze dives on Petrof Bay on 26 October 1944. The kamikaze's tail and part of its right wing have been shot off by anti-aircraft fire, and it is visibly on fire, causing it to miss.

Whilst the Japanese ships were being harried by the aircraft of "Taffy 1", two kamikaze strike groups took off from Cebu on the morning of 26 October, the first group consisting of two kamikazes and one escort, and the second group consisting of three kamikazes and two escorts. The first group was quickly intercepted by American fighters and all shot down, but the second group proceeded towards "Taffy 1" undetected, only being picked up by radar when it was 35 mi (56 km) away from the fleet. Fighters returning from the attack on the Japanese ships were diverted to intercept the second group, but were distracted by the escorts, enabling the kamikazes to make their runs against the escort carriers. The first kamikaze, apparently intent on diving on Petrof Bay, was shot down by a fighter, whilst the other two kamikazes began making their dives at 12:38. The second kamikaze dove onto, and struck Suwanee, whilst the third kamikaze dove down on Petrof Bay, but it had its tail shot off by intense flak at an elevation of approximately 500 ft (150 m), and it crashed into the sea just 50 ft (15 m) off the stern of Petrof Bay.

During the night of 28 October, Petrof Bay retired to refuel, rendezvousing with Taffy 2. On the afternoon of 30 October, Petrof Bay, along with the rest of "Taffy 1", retired for Manus Island. Remarkably, despite the loss of several of her aircraft, and the fact that VC-76 had logged 15,000 flight hours over a period of eight months of active combat, the entirety of the crew of VC-76 survived the Philippines campaign. Seventeen Navy Crosses were awarded amongst the aircrew of VC-76, and Captain Kane also received a Navy Cross.

After arriving at Manus, Petrof Bay was assigned to Task Unit 77.4.5, the Reinforcement Carrier Group, and she was yet again under the flag of Rear Admiral Henderson. During her stay at Manus, Captain Ralph Sperry Clarke took over command of the vessel. She was damaged by the November 1944 USS Mount Hood (AE-11) explosion. She departed Manus Harbor on 19 November, arriving in the traffic lanes leading to Leyte on 23 November, whereupon she began operations providing air cover for convoys proceeding to and departing from the Philippines, a task necessary due to the convoys being harassed with irritating frequency by Japanese aircraft based on Mindanao. She continued these operations until the end of the year, when she was detached from Task Group 77.3, and joined up with Task Force 79, Vice Admiral Theodore Stark Wilkinson's Lingayen Attack Force, in support of the Invasion of Lingayen Gulf. She provided air cover for the attack transports of the task force as they proceeded to Lingayen Gulf, and gave close air support as they landed. The task force came under intense kamikaze attack as it proceeded up the South China Sea to northern Luzon, sinking her sister Ommaney Bay on 4 January 1945, and damaging several other carriers. This forced Petrof Bay into assuming double duty, taking on some of the sunken carrier's assigned tasks.

On 10 January, Task Unit 77.4.6, the Close Covering Carrier Group was formed under the command of Rear Admiral Henderson, comprising Petrof Bay, Saginaw Bay, and Marcus Island. The group was screened by the destroyers Charrette and Conner, as well as the destroyer escorts Richard S. Bull and Richard M. Rowell. On 17 January, the United States Army Air Forces took over responsibility for air operations over Luzon, and Petrof Bay joined Rear Admiral Russell S. Berkey's fleet operating west of northern Mindoro. On 29 and 30 January, Petrof Bay provided air cover and close air support as the Eighth Army landed at San Narciso and San Antonio, located just to the north of Manila, where they prepared for the Battle of Manila.

=== Battle of Iwo Jima ===
Upon helping the Eighth Army gain a foothold north of Manila, Petrof Bay retired for Ulithi of the Caroline Islands. Just five days later, she departed Ulithi, this time assigned to Task Unit 52.2.1, under the command of Rear Admiral Clifton Sprague, in preparation for the Battle of Iwo Jima. The Air Force wanted the island base neutralized to eliminate the threat of fighter interceptions, and also because they wanted to use the island as a base to provide fighter escorts for the B-29 Superfortress raids on Tokyo and other assorted Japanese cities. She arrived off of Iwo Jima on 15 February, in company with Task Group 52.19, the Advance Movement Group.

Upon arriving, Petrof Bay's air contingent commenced operations over the island, which in conjunction with surface bombardment, aimed to soften the Japanese defenses. On 17 February, one of her Avengers was hit by anti-aircraft fire, and was then subsequently forced to ditch next to a friendly destroyer. On 18 February, the troop transports carrying the Marines arrived offshore, and they landed on Iwo Jima the following day. Throughout the battle, Petrof Bay's aircraft logged 786 air sorties conducted in support of the operation. Notably, on 21 February, the fleet carrier Saratoga was hit by a kamikaze, and Petrof Bay, which was heading to refuel, was recalled back by Vice Admiral Calvin T. Durgin.

By 7 March, the airstrip on Iwo Jima had been captured and restored to be fully operational, enabling ground-based aircraft to provide close air support in lieu of the carriers. On 8 March, Petrof Bay retired to Ulithi, stopping at Guam in the Marianas Islands along the way. At Guam, Composite Squadron (VC) 76 was disembarked and replaced with Composite Squadron (VC) 93 on 10 March.

=== Battle of Okinawa ===
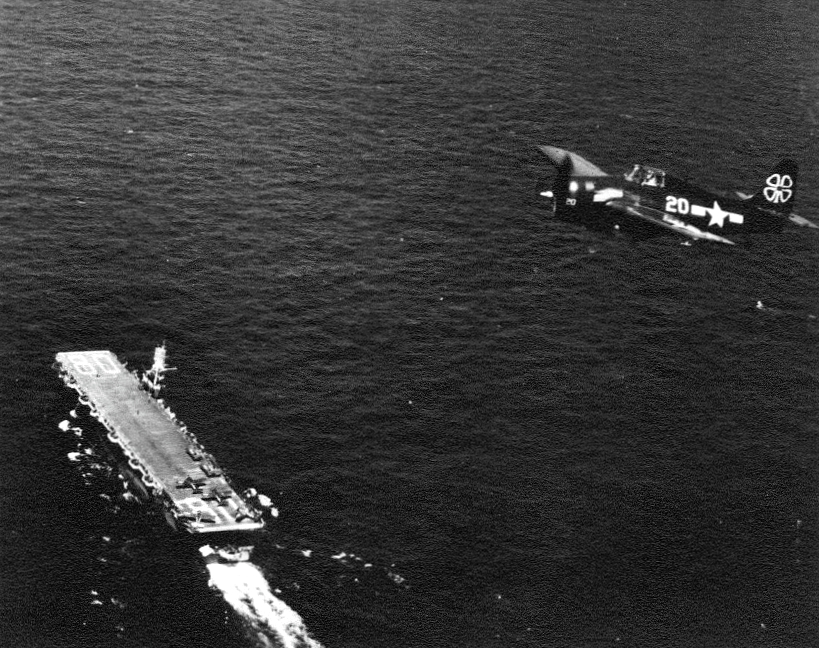
An FM-2 Wildcat fighter of Composite Squadron (VC) 93 is photographed flying over Petrof Bay during the Battle of Okinawa, circa April 1945.

At Ulithi, Petrof Bay was assigned to Task Unit 52.1.2, under the command of Rear Admiral Felix Stump, in preparation for the Battle of Okinawa. She departed on 21 March, escorting Task Group 54.1 en route. Upon arriving, on March 26, Petrof Bay covered the Marines that landed on the Kerama Islands as a preliminary for the main battle. On March 31, she also provided support for the Marines landing on Keise Shima, a small archipelago of islets 8 mi (13 km) to the west of Naha. On 1 April, the main landings on Okinawa took place, and aircraft from Petrof Bay provided close air support every step of the way.

On 13 April, Petrof Bay was ordered to neutralize Japanese airfields in the Sakishima Islands, from which kamikazes were operating. The first strikes were launched from a distance of 228 mi (367 km) away, and her aircraft engaged heavy anti-aircraft fire upon arrival, which shot down two fighters, including VC-93's commander, albeit the crew of both aircraft were quickly rescued. By 16 April, Petrof Bay had resumed her typical operations over Okinawa.

Petrof Bay continued air operations, with occasional breaks for refueling, rearming, and resupply until 26 May, when she was relieved of her duty by the arrival of other escort carriers. VC-93 had shot down seventeen enemy aircraft, had a probable kill on another, and destroyed many other planes on the ground, but it had lost four Wildcats due to combat, six Wildcats operationally, and it had also lost four Avengers operationally. To alleviate the pressure on the fighter pilots, six of the Avenger pilots had volunteered to become fighter pilots, with one of these "hybrid" pilots becoming VC-93's top scorer, shooting down four aircraft. Petrof Bay had lost the lives of two pilots and one crewman in the course of the operation.

Upon being relieved, Petrof Bay headed for Guam, entering Apra Harbor on 30 May. There, Composite Squadron (VC) 93 was disembarked, and Composite Squadron (VC) 90 was taken onboard, albeit for transportation to Pearl Harbor. On 19 June, she arrived at Naval Air Base San Pedro, on Terminal Island, for a general overhaul. She completed her overhaul on 13 August, and sailed for Pearl Harbor. En route, on 15 August, news of the Surrender of Japan reached the crew.

== Post-war ==
Petrof Bay arrived at Pearl Harbor on 20 August, whereupon she took onboard Composite Squadron (VC) 20 for qualifying exercises off Hawaii. Upon completing said exercises, she unloaded VC-20 and took onboard the crew and aircraft of Composite Squadron (VC) 4, and steamed for Tokyo Bay on 29 August, stopping at Enewetak in the Marshall Islands and Saipan in the Marianas Islands along the way. She conducted flight operations with VC-4 along the way, providing reconnaissance and anti-submarine patrols. The last plane to touch down on Petrof Bay's flight deck was a TBM Avenger, which landed at 16:28 on 10 September, whilst the carrier was transiting off Saipan. She arrived at Saipan on 11 September, where a shift in orders meant that she would not have to continue to Tokyo Bay. She headed back to Pearl Harbor on 25 September, carrying onboard 104 personnel of Composite Squadron (VC) 7, as well as other military passengers. She unloaded the entirety of her aircraft contingent at Pearl Harbor upon arriving.

At Pearl Harbor, Petrof Bay embarked 123 personnel of Patrol Bombing Squadron (VPB) 52 and more military passengers, departing Oahu on 5 October, and sailing into San Francisco on 11 October, where she disembarked her passengers, as well as the crew of VC-4. On 18 October, she made a round trip to Pearl Harbor, ferrying veterans back to the West Coast, returning on 31 October. She then entered Hunters Point Naval Shipyard for alterations to accommodate more passengers, and upon the completion of said alterations, joined the Operation Magic Carpet fleet, which repatriated U.S. servicemen from throughout the Pacific.

Petrof Bay's first "Magic Carpet" run began on 17 November, when she departed for Enewetak, where she loaded 1,062 veterans, followed by another 153 more at Kwajalein in the Marshall Islands. She returned to San Francisco on 6 December, and she made another run on 12 December, this time to Guam, where she took on 944 veterans. She then proceeded to San Pedro Bay, arriving there on 18 January 1946. She departed San Pedro on 29 January, unloading her passengers at San Diego. She then headed for the East Coast for inactivation work, passing through the Panama Canal, and arriving at Norfolk, Virginia on 15 February. She then proceeded northwards to Boston, Massachusetts, arriving there on 23 February.

Upon arriving, Petrof Bay was decommissioned and mothballed on 31 July 1946, joining the Boston group of the Atlantic Reserve Fleet, mooring at the South Boston Naval Annex. On 12 June 1955, she was redesignated as a utility aircraft carrier, receiving the hull symbol CVU-80. She was struck from the Navy list on 27 June 1958, and she was sold for scrapping on 30 July 1959 to J. Berkurt. She was ultimately broken up in Antwerp, Belgium during September 1959. Petrof Bay received five battle stars for her World War II service.

== Sources ==
=== Online sources ===
- "'Petrof Bay' (CVE-80)". Dictionary of American Naval Fighting Ships. Naval History and Heritage Command. 27 April 2016. Archived from the original on 18 October 2020. This article incorporates text from this source, which is in the public domain.
- Hackett, Bob; Kingsepp, Sander (1 October 2018). "IJN Kumano: Tabular Record of Movement". combinedfleet.com.
- "Kaiser Vancouver, Vancouver WA". www.ShipbuildingHistory.com. 27 November 2010. Archived from the original on 16 June 2019.
- "World Aircraft Carriers List: US Escort Carriers, S4 Hulls". Hazegray.org. 14 December 1998. Archived from the original on 19 November 2021.
- Maksel, Rebecca (14 August 2012). "How Do You Name an Aircraft Carrier?". Air & Space/Smithsonian.
- Nichols, Robert (2004). "The first kamikaze attack?". Wartime (28). Australian War Memorial. Archived from the original on 2 October 2009.

=== Bibliography ===
- Adcock, Al (1996), Escort Carriers in Action - Warships No. 9, Carrollton, Texas: Squadron/Signal Publications, ISBN 9780897473569
- Chesneau, Robert; Gardiner, Robert (1980), Conway's All the World's Fighting Ships 1922–1946, London, England: Naval Institute Press, ISBN 9780870219139
- Friedman, Norman (1983), U.S. Aircraft Carriers: An Illustrated Design History, Annapolis, Maryland: Naval Institute Press, ISBN 9780870217395
- Ross, Al (1993), The Escort Carrier Gambier Bay, Anatomy of the Ship, London, England: Conway Maritime Press, ISBN 9781557502353
- Y'Blood, William (2012), The Little Giants: U.S. Escort Carriers Against Japan, Annapolis, Maryland: Naval Institute Press, ISBN 9781612512471
