= Petrof Bay =

- Location within Alaska
- Location: Alaska
- Coordinates: 56°24′10″N 134°03′48″W
- Type: Bay

Petrof Bay is a small bay on the west side of Kuiu Island in the Alexander Archipelago in southeastern Alaska, United States. It is located at 56°N 134°W and opens into the Chatham Strait.

The bay was named in 1924 for U.S. Census Bureau employee Ivan Petrof, whose reports of his travels in the late 19th century are a valuable source of Alaska history for that period.

The US Navy aircraft carrier USS Petrof Bay, launched in January 1944, was named after it.
