= Quota International =

Organization

Quota International, Inc.
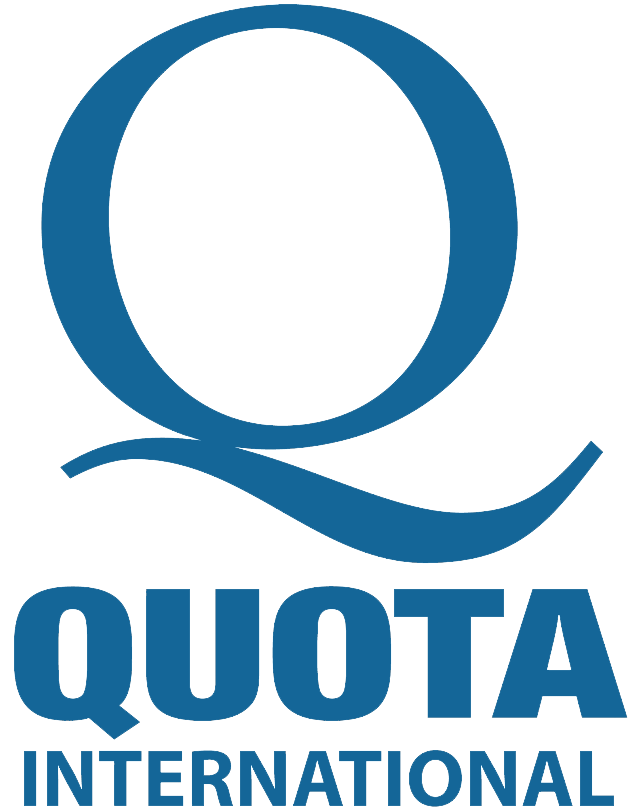
- Formation: 1919
- Founders: Wanda Frey Joiner
- Type: Service organization
- Headquarters: Washington, D.C.
- Origins: Buffalo, New York
- Region served: 14 countries worldwide
- Members: 5,600 members
- International President: Emilie Simon

Quota International, Inc. is an international service organization that, provides basic needs to women, children, the deaf, and hard of hearing in communities around the world. Quota International's world service projects were aligned with the United Nations' Millennium Development Goals. Specifically, Quota clubs worked towards UN MDG Goals 1 and 3: to eradicate extreme poverty and hunger, and to promote gender equality and empower women, respectively. The organization was founded in Buffalo, New York, in 1919 by Wanda Frey Joiner, as a service club for women similar to that of popular all-male clubs.

== History ==
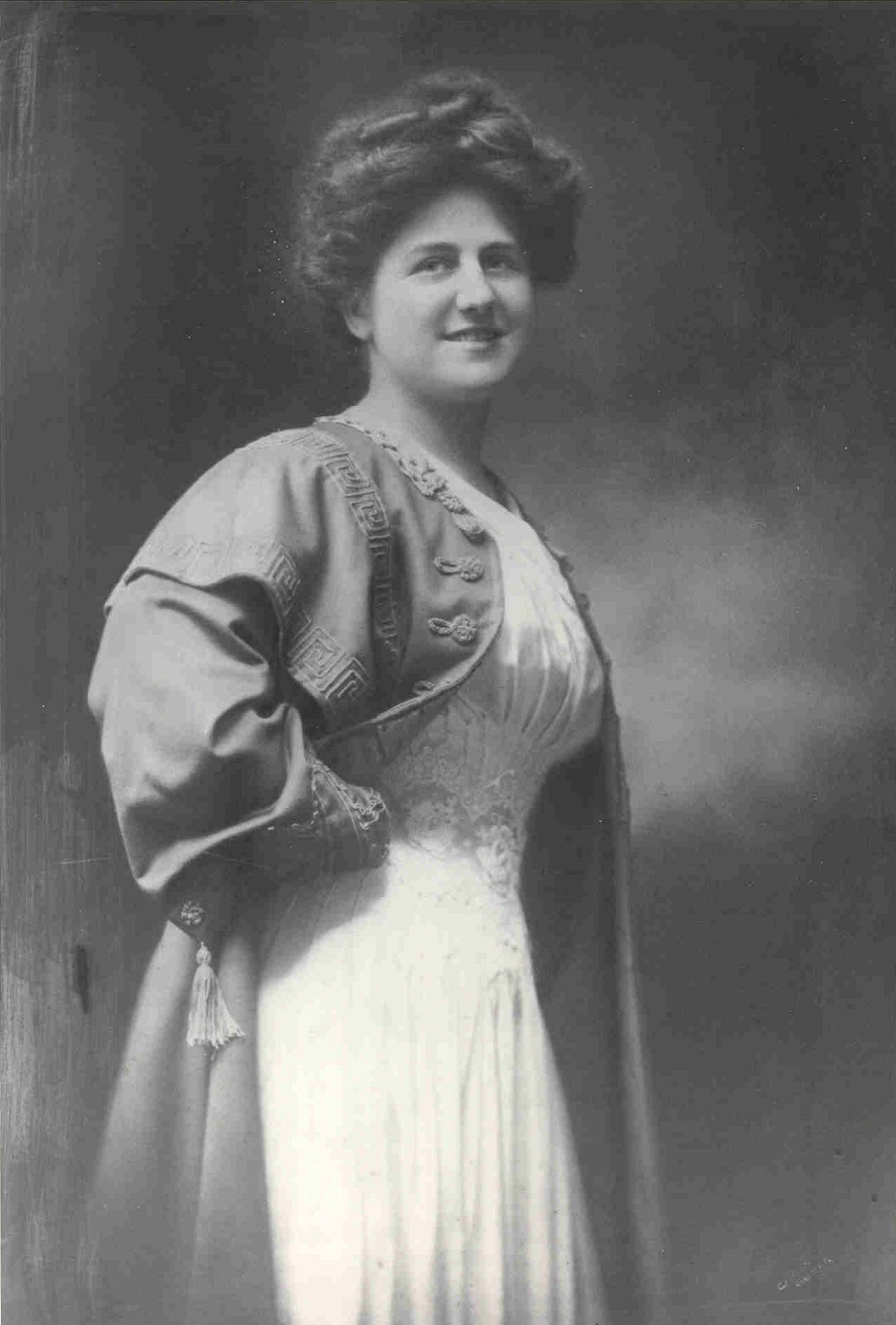
Wanda Frey Joiner

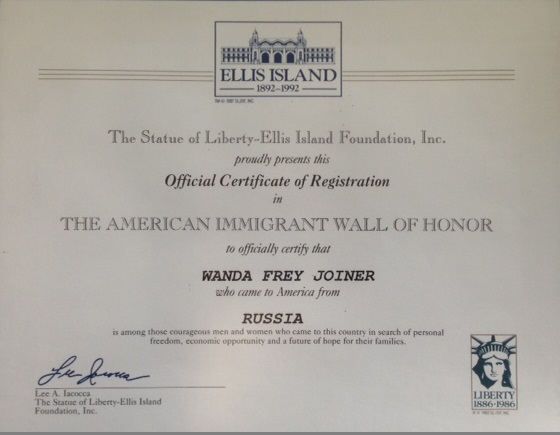
Wanda Frey Joiner: American Immigrant Wall of Honor

=== Wanda Frey Joiner ===
Wanda Frey Joiner was born in Odessa in 1882. Her father, Alexander Frey, was of German heritage and studied at the Imperial Academy of Arts in St. Petersburg. Shortly after her father's death, Wanda and her mother immigrated to the United States. Her maternal grandfather, Ludwig Koehler, was a noted German poet and doctor of philosophy. In 1907 Wanda Frey was married to Robert Parks Joiner, but was widowed only three years later. After her husband's death she took an extensive business course at Caton's National Business College in Buffalo. Joiner found work in the Buffalo paint and glass industry as a filing clerk. Over the years she worked her way up the ranks. She became a member of the board of directors, president and general manager, and eventually helped lead two firms to multimillion-dollar status. Joiner founded Quota International, Inc. with four other female business colleagues. Joiner served as the first International President of the Quota International. Throughout her life she continued to build upon her business ventures while also devoting time to Quota International. In 1968 Joiner died at her home in Los Angeles, California. In accordance with her will, a memorial fund was established in her name to help in the establishment of new Quota clubs and to strengthen existing clubs.

=== Early years ===
==== Formation ====
Less than a month after the end of the First World War, the idea for an international women's service organization arose at a ladies Christmas party at the Kiwanis Club in Buffalo, New York in 1918. During the war, many women found ways to assist the war effort by joining the workforce and organizing campaigns to support troops abroad. When the war ended, many women wanted to continue down the road of female employment and empowerment. Quota international was formed from that fervor.

The organization was founded by Wanda Frey Joiner and four other prominent female businesswomen from the Buffalo area: Florence M. Smith, Alice C. Sauers, Ora G. Cole, Jean Ware Redpath. These women joined together to charter and incorporate an all-female service club on February 6, 1919. This feat was impressive because it took place one year before U.S. women were granted their right to vote via the 19th Amendment. After Quota's initial charter and incorporation the organization began establishing local clubs in nearby states.

==== International influence ====
Quota International established its first club outside of the United States in Winnipeg, Manitoba, Canada, in 1925, making Quota the first international women's service organization. Although Altrusa International was formed as a women's service club in 1917, it was incorporated as a national organization. Its title was The National Association of Altrusa Clubs, before it became an international service organization in 1935. After Quota's foundation in February 1919, other women's service organizations formed in the same manner. Zonta International was established in Buffalo, New York, in November 1919 to advance the status of women and became an alternative to Quota International. Soroptimist International was formed in October 1921 as a community service organization for business and professional women. After establishing an international base, Quota International, Inc. continued to grow in Canada and eventually to Australia, New Zealand, India, the Philippines, Malaysia, Fiji, Aruba, Curaçao, Sint Eustatius, the Netherlands, and Suriname.

During the early years of Quota, the organization's focus targeted and promoted: good citizenship, crime prevention, extending friendly relations, gaining recognition for the achievements of women, and international relations. However, with the outbreak of the Second World War, priorities for the club changed. Quotarians worked together to raise funds to purchase two ambulances for the Red Cross and worked on a variety of other war and defense projects, including: joining the civil defense, helping at nurseries, canteen work, selling war bonds, performing blood typing, sewing and knitting, and attending first aid courses. Upon the conclusion of the war, the organization modified its objectives. At the 1946 convention it was decided that Quota International would now emphasize service for the needs of the deaf and hard-of-hearing, while continuing to support and empower women and children.

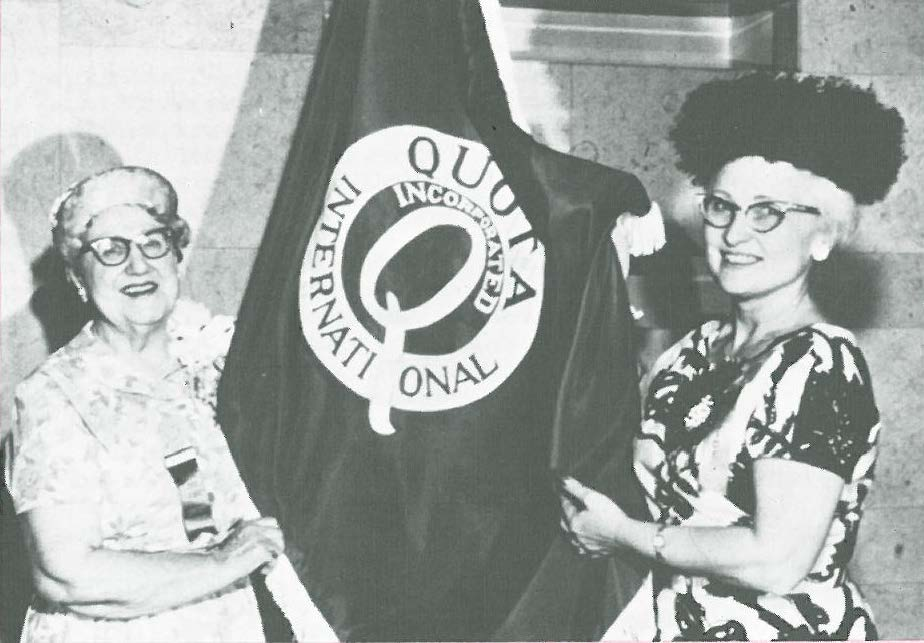
Wanda Frey Joiner, left, receives an official Quota Flag from Helen Agnew at the 1963 Los Angeles Convention.

=== Name ===
The group of founding women wanted to select a short and memorable name that reflected their values and goals for the club. One member looked through the dictionary and came upon a Latin word quota, meaning "a share of one part to a whole." They named the organization, Quota Club International, Inc., which was shortened in 1961 to simply, Quota International, Inc.

=== World Center for Women's Archives ===
At Quota International's 20th Convention in 1939, the organization promoted the World Center for Women's Archives in New York, which had formed in 1935. This World Center was also supported by many famous women's rights activist, including: Inez Haynes Irwin, Florence E. Allen, Dorothy Thompson, Ida Tarbell, Mary R. Beard, and Rosika Schwimmer. Despite Quota's efforts, the Women's Archives closed and dissolved in 1940 due to inadequate funding and internal disputes.

=== Dissolution ===
On September 30, 2020, the Quota International Board of Directors voted to propose the dissolution of Quota International, Inc., The primary cause for this decision was the drop of Quota's membership below a level that was viable to sustain the organization going forward. Thirty-two clubs had dissolved since October 1, 2018, and Quota's membership at that time had dropped to a new low of 3,638 members, a drop of 416 members and 32 clubs as of October 1, 2018—just one year before.

== Purpose ==
=== Mission ===
Quota International is a non-profit organization empowering women, children, the deaf and hard-of-hearing, and people with speech difficulties in local communities around the world.

The objectives of Quota International shall be to seek individuals committed to sharing their time, talent, and resources to meet Quota International's service goals, and more particularly:

- To serve country and community;
- To promote high ethical standards;
- To emphasize the dignity of all useful occupations;
- To develop good fellowship and friendship; and
- To advance the ideals of righteousness, justice, international understanding, and good will.

=== Motto ===
The motto of Quota International, Inc. is "We Share." The founders hoped to share their talents and abilities to help people in need. Members continue to uphold this motto through community service, developing meaningful friendships, and promoting international understanding.

== Organization ==
=== Board of directors ===
The organization is supervised by a 5-member board of directors. Every two years the organization holds an international convention where international officers are elected by the membership. These international officers are guided by the Quota International Bylaws and Rules of Procedure which were created in 1919 and are amended annually.

=== Regional directors ===
In 2014, Quota International updated its organizational structure, dissolving the 43 districts that had been in place since 1933. The new structure allows for 20 regions, each with its own regional director. These new regional directors are elected every two years.

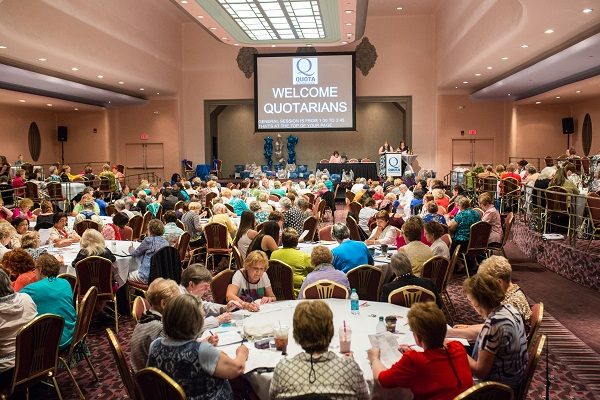
Quota International 2014 Convention, Cincinnati, Ohio

== Clubs and membership ==
=== "Quotarians" ===
This is the name given to members of Quota International. Quotarians are located in many countries around the world working to better their communities and serve others. There are approximately 5,600 Quotarians who comprise 270 Quota clubs. Every two years Quotarians come together for an international convention to share ideas and service projects, vote on changes to club leadership and organization, and build fellowship.

==== Notable Quotarians ====
- The Honorable Ruth Bryan Owen – Florida's first female representative in the U.S. Congress and diplomat; elected honorary member in 1934
- Viscountess Nancy Astor – First female member of British Parliament in the House of Commons; elected honorary member in 1938
- Ms. Nanette Fabray – American actress, dancer, and singer who overcame hearing impairment and became an advocate for the rights of the deaf and hard-of-hearing; elected honorary member in 1976
- Ms. Edna P. Adler – Member of the Rehabilitation Services Administration of the U.S. Department of Education, researched and developed comprehensive rehabilitation services for the deaf and hard-of-hearing; elected to honorary recognition in 1980

=== Quota International Club ===
These are the general local clubs associated with Quota International, also known as QI clubs. Both women and men can join QI clubs around the world. Each club can generate its own goals and service projects to help women, children, the deaf, hard-of-hearing, speech-impaired, and community members in need. QI clubs must apply to become legal entities before being granted charter.

=== Silver Q Quota Club ===
These clubs are targeted at an older population of Quotarians. Q clubs tend to focus on short-term and simple acts of service and promoting fellowship among members. Many Silver Q Quotarians are retired and can devote more time to many small service projects to help their community.

=== Next Gen Quota Club ===
These clubs are targeted at a young adults, parents, and professionals. Next Gen Quota Clubs tend to be flexible to meet the busy schedules of their members. These Quotarians participate in service projects and programs, act as community leaders, and network with other like-minded individuals wishing to serve their community.

=== Junior Quota Club ===
These clubs are branches of a Quota International club and are targeted at students in primary and secondary school and even college. Junior Quotarians typically assist their supporting Quota International clubs in service projects. In addition, some Junior Quota clubs develop their own service events to improve their schools or assist other areas in need.

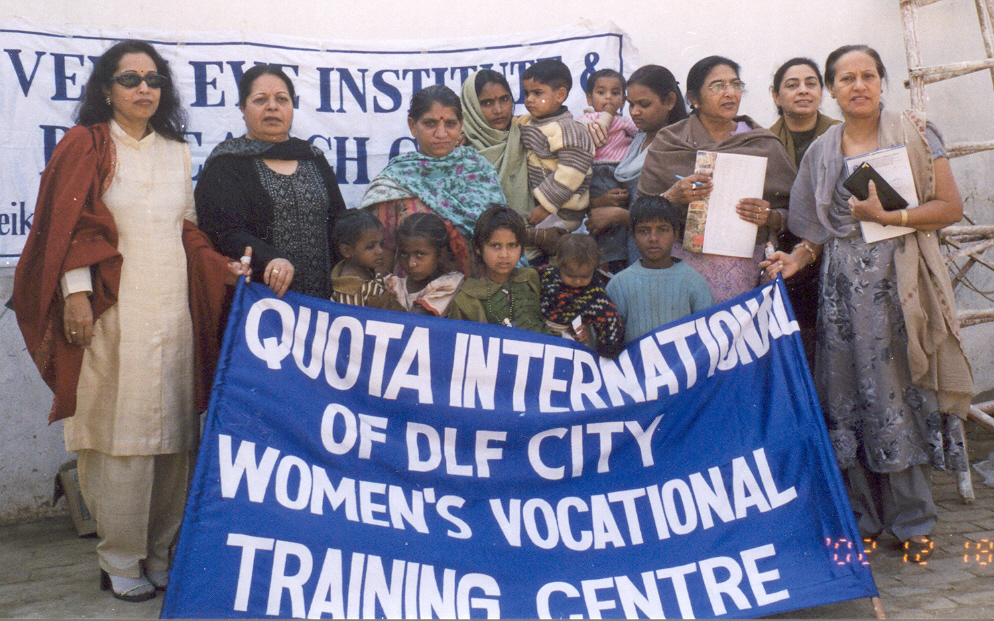
Quota International of DLF City

== Service projects ==
The three areas of focus for Quota International Service Projects are: "World Service", "Disadvantaged Women & Children", and "Hearing & Speech". Quota Clubs around the world work together to perform service projects and develop programs in their communities based on these platforms. Some of the projects performed by local clubs entail: promoting healthy hearing habits, helping to empower impoverished women and children, developing literacy programs, providing comfort and mentoring programs, etc. Clubs hold fundraisers throughout the year to raise money for their charitable projects. The "Listen Up, Turn It Down" public awareness campaign has been popular among many Quota clubs.

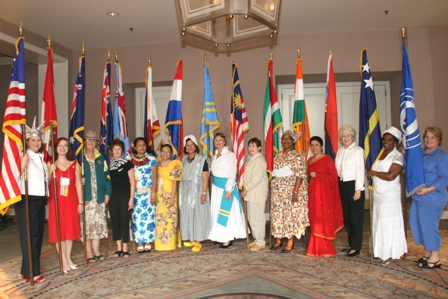
Quota International countries' flags

=== We Share Foundation ===
The We Share Foundation is a charitable organization established to support club service projects and programs in critical areas. "Quota's We Share Foundation provides training, guidance, technical support, publications, and grants, including sharing time, talents, and resources to those who are deaf, hard-of-hearing, or speech-impaired." Donations to the We Share Foundation also contribute to the Quotarian magazine, a publication about Quota projects, events, and members.

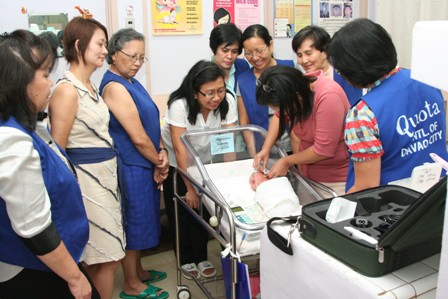
Quota International of Davao City: Infant audiological screening tests

=== Hand-in-Hand World Service ===
This program was developed in 1983, under the name Club-to-Club, to organize Quota clubs in developing countries. There are 21 Quota Club projects in six developing countries: Fiji, India, Malaysia, the Philippines, Suriname, and Trinidad and Tobago. The program was set up to assist individuals and also increase the awareness of international issues around the world.

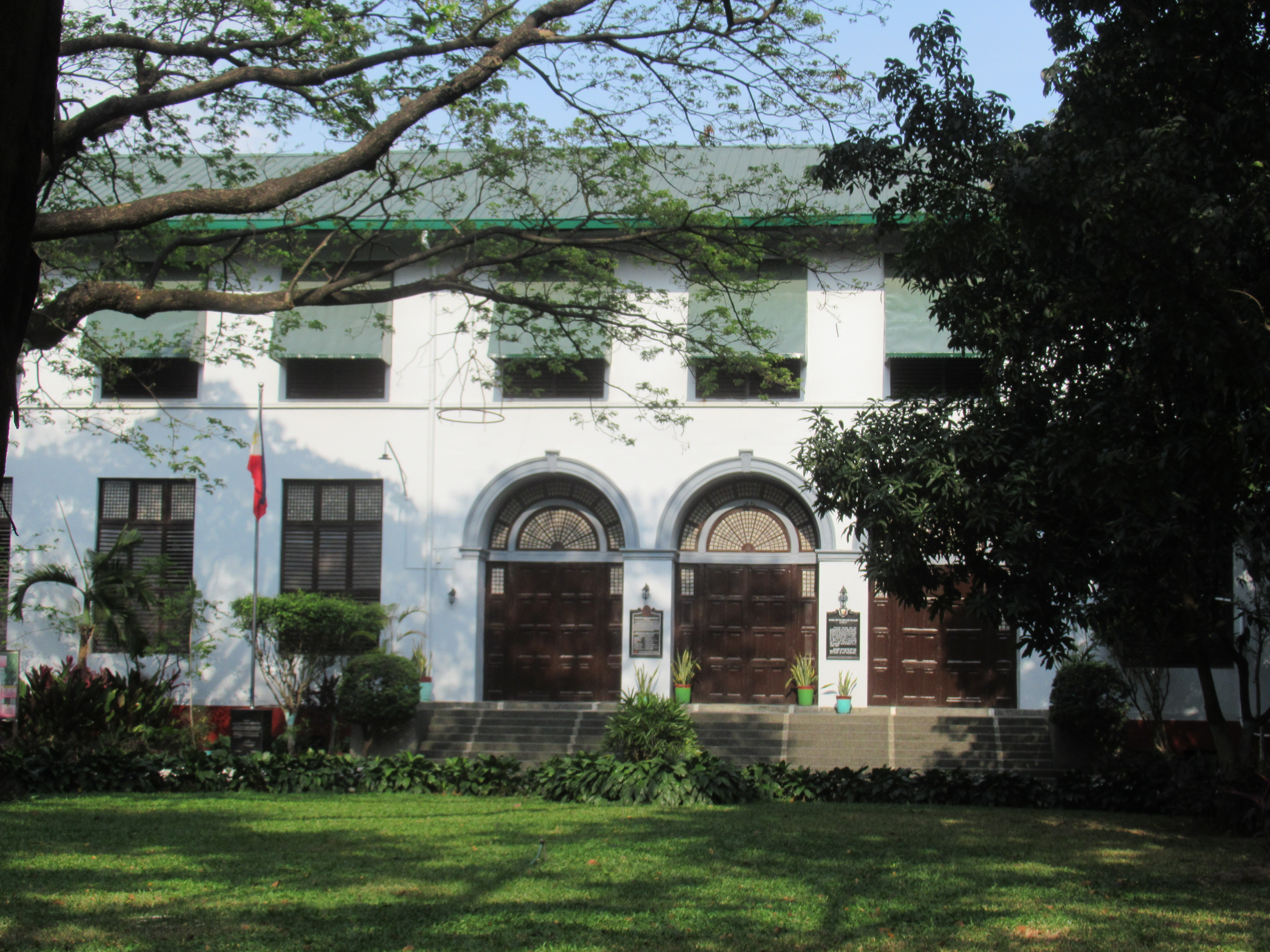
Philippine School for the Deaf (Quota International of Manila)

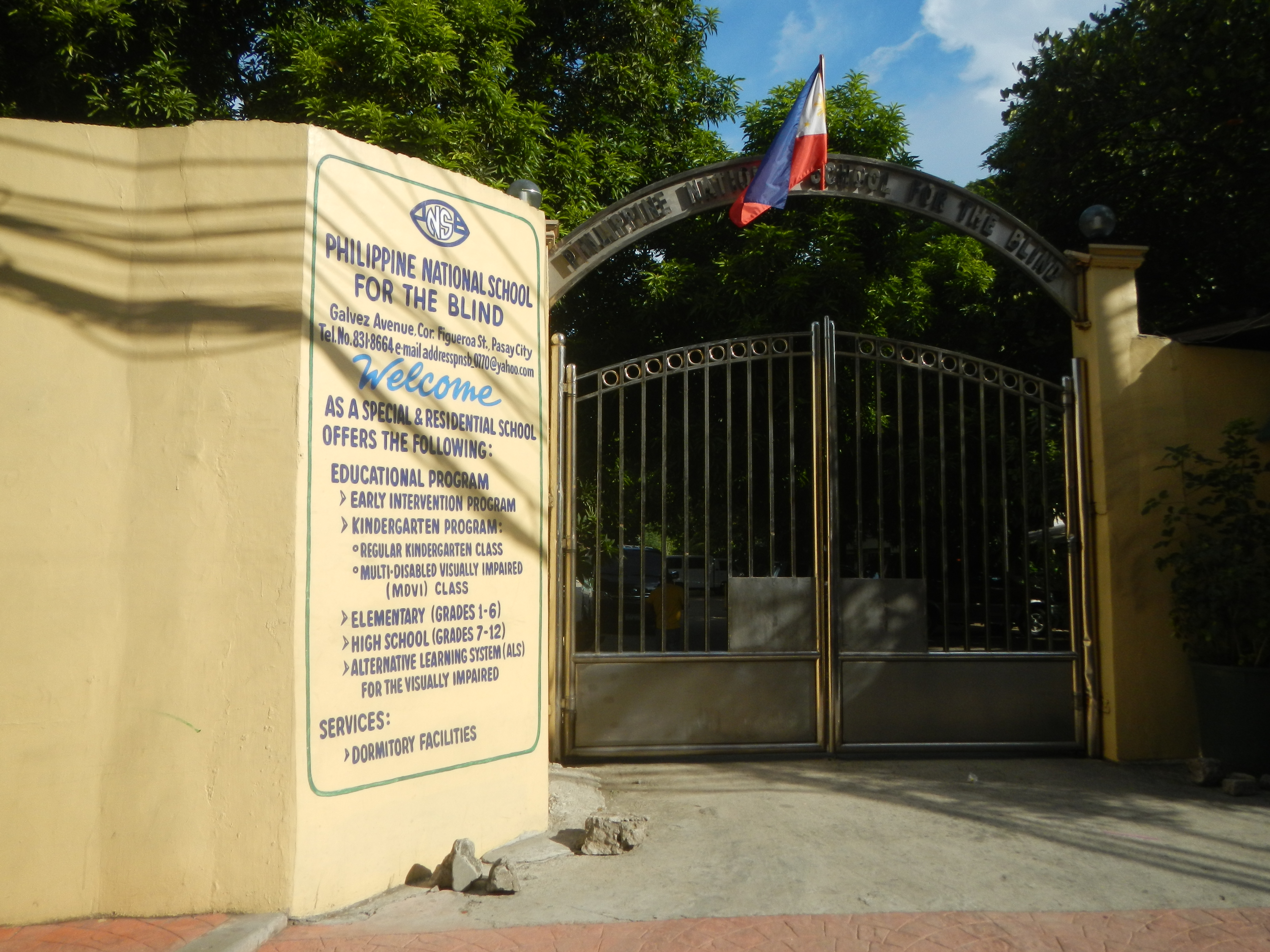
Philippine National School for the Blind (Quota International of Manila)

== Partnerships ==
Since its inception, Quota International has partnered with a number of organizations that help women, children, the deaf, hard-of-hearing, and speech-impaired. These organizations include:

- The United Nations ECOSOC: NGO in Consultative Status
- UNA-USA Council of Organizations: Member Organization
- UNICEF
- HHS: National Institute on Deafness and Other Communication Disorders (NIDCD)
- CARE: the Quota International-CARE "Key to Development" project was developed to establish clean water sources to Kenyan villages; Quota Assisted in the CARE-MEDICO program that trained nurses in Afghanistan
- National Association of the Deaf (United States) (NAD): Organizational Affiliate
- Youth Service America: National partners

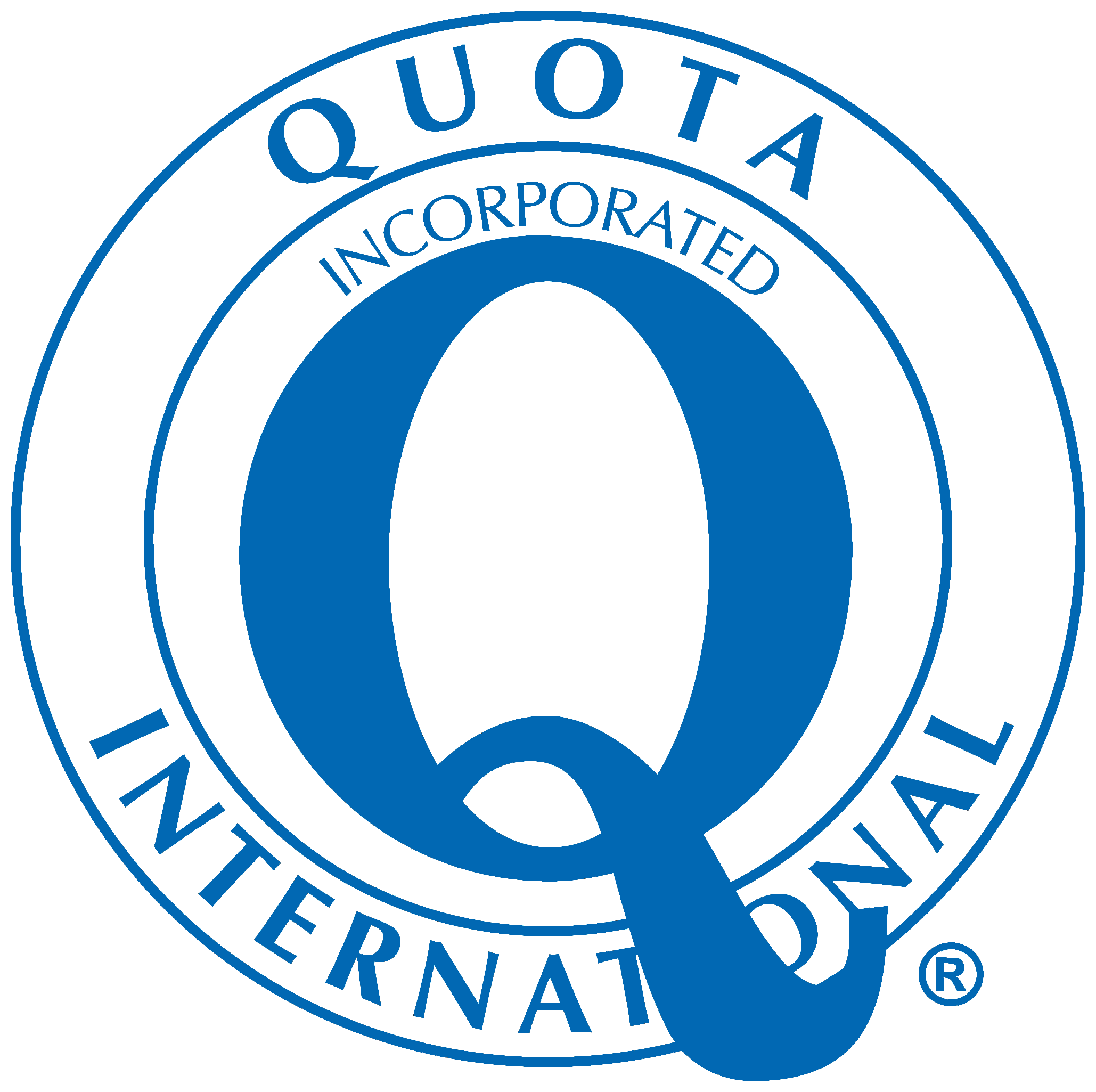
Alternative logo

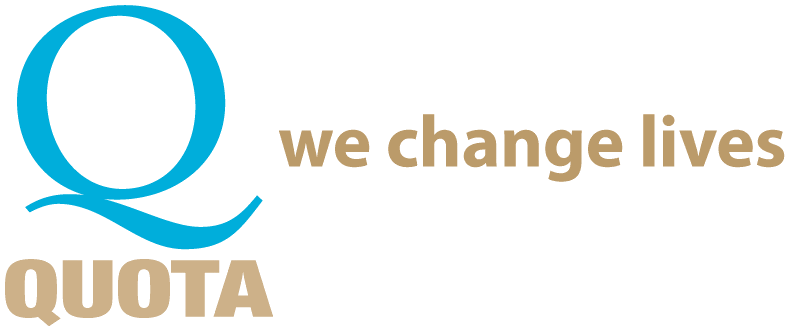
Alternative logo and motto

== Controversy ==
Over the years there has been some controversy over the name "Quota", specifically in the United States and Australia. Some have thought it to be a negative term, especially in the context of women, having to do with regulations, limited quantities, and affirmative action. In addition, there has been tension about the organization's logo and motto. Some individuals believe changes within the organization would be positive, while others wish to keep the status quo. There was also some discontent with regards to the restructuring of the organization, as stated above: Organization.
