= Ivan Petrof =

Russian-born soldier, writer and translator

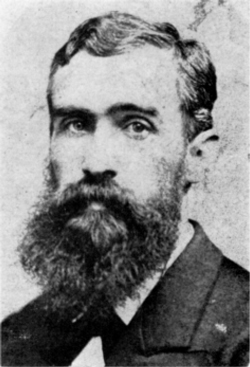
Ivan Petrof, date unknown

Ivan Petrof (1842? - 1896) (commonly spelled "Petroff" in sources) was a Russian-born soldier, writer, and translator who for many years was regarded as a major authority on Alaska. According to historian Terrence Cole, Petrof "holds the distinction of probably telling more lies about Alaska that were believed for more years than any other person in history."

Petrof's early history is obscure. He served in the United States Army 1867-1870, including service at Fort Kenai in Alaska as a translator. He re-enlisted in 1871 and subsequently deserted, though he later obtained a special discharge through political influence. He worked for H.H. Bancroft starting in about 1874 and was an author of Bancroft's History of Alaska. He traveled to Sitka in 1878 to collect and translate source material. According to Cole, a dozen of the documents he returned with were complete forgeries (though this was not recognized until many years later).

Petrof was special agent of the United States Tenth Census (1880) for Alaska. He traveled extensively in Alaska and then prepared the Report on the Population, Industries, and Resources of Alaska, which forms 189 pages of Volume VIII of the Tenth Census, published in 1884. This report and two general maps of Alaska were issued by the Census Office, one dated 1880 and the other 1882. Petrof's census results are still cited; in this context historian Stephen Haycox writes that "in the final analysis his work has been considered generally reliable and hugely influential."

A preliminary version of the report on the population, industries, and resources of Alaska was published early in 1881 as House of Representative Ex. Doc. No. 40, Forty-sixth Congress, third session. This report contains a general map of Alaska showing Petrof's travel route for his census work. He traveled through Kodiak, the Shumagin Islands, Sannak, Belkofski, Unalaska, Unimak, Atka, the Pribilof Islands, and St. Michael. He also journeyed for considerable distances up the Yukon and Kuskokwim rivers.

After 1880 he lived in Kodiak, Alaska. From 1883-1887 he was assistant collector of Customs at Kodiak. Subsequently he was director of the 1890 census for Alaska.

In 1892, while writing up the census results, he was asked to serve as a translator for the US State Department in connection with the Bering Sea Arbitration. It was discovered that he had inserted his own interpolations into the translated Russian documents; this caused great embarrassment to the United States since the translations had already been submitted to the tribunal. This ended his public career and called his previous work into question. Subsequently it has been discovered that much of what he said and wrote about his own experience was false.

Petrof Bay on Kuiu Island in the Alaska Panhandle and (probably) Petrof Glacier on the Kenai Peninsula are named for Ivan Petrof.

== Works ==
- Journal of a Trip of Alaska, 1878
- Map of Alaska and Adjoining Regions, 1880
- Map of Alaska and Adjoining Regions, 1882
- Report on the Population, Industries, and Resources of Alaska, in the Volume VIII of the Tenth Census, published in 1884
- Petroff Papers, mostly letters, in the Bancroft Library.
