= History of Hispanic and Latino Americans in the United States =

The history of Hispanics and Latinos in the United States is wide-ranging, spanning more than four hundred years of American colonial and post-colonial history. Hispanics (whether criollo, mulatto, afro-mestizo or mestizo) became the first American citizens in the newly acquired Southwest territory after the Mexican–American War, and remained a majority in several states until the 20th century.

As late as 1783, at the end of the American Revolutionary War, Spain held claim to roughly half of today's continental United States. In the Treaty of Paris France ceded Louisiana (New France) to Spain from 1763 until it was returned in 1800 by the Treaty of San Ildefonso. In 1775, Spanish ships reached Alaska. From 1819 to 1848, the United States and its army increased the nation's area by roughly a third at Spanish and Mexican expense, gaining among others three of today's four most populous states: California, Texas and Florida.

== Spanish expeditions ==
=== Spanish expeditions that took place in the South and East of North America ===
The first confirmed landing in the continental United States was by a Spaniard, Juan Ponce de León, who landed in 1513 at a lush shore he christened La Florida. Within three decades of Ponce de León's landing, the Spanish became the first Europeans to reach the Appalachian Mountains, the Mississippi River, the Grand Canyon and the Great Plains. Spanish ships sailed along the East Coast, penetrating to present-day Bangor, Maine, and up the Pacific Coast as far as Oregon.

From 1528 to 1536, four castaways from a Spanish expedition, including a "black" Moor, Estevanico, journeyed all the way from Florida to the Gulf of California, 267 years before Lewis and Clark embarked on their much more renowned and far less arduous trek.

In 1540 Hernando de Soto undertook an extensive exploration of the present US, developing expeditions in Georgia, The Carolinas, Tennessee, Alabama, Mississippi, Arkansas, Oklahoma, Texas and Louisiana; and in the same year Francisco Vásquez de Coronado led 2,000 Spaniards and Mexican Indians across today's Arizona–Mexico border. Coronado travelled as far as central Kansas, close to the exact geographic center of what is now the continental United States and he was the first European that saw the Canyon's Colorado. Other Spanish explorers of the US make up a long list that includes among others, Lucas Vásquez de Ayllón, Pánfilo de Narváez, Sebastián Vizcaíno, Juan Rodríguez Cabrillo, Gaspar de Portolà, Pedro Menéndez de Avilés, Álvar Núñez Cabeza de Vaca, Tristán de Luna y Arellano and Juan de Oñate. All of them explored the South of the present-day USA. On the other hand, Esteban Gomes led expeditions along the eastern coasts of North America as far as Nova Scotia.

The Spanish settled within the area, creating the first permanent European settlement in the continental United States, at St. Augustine, Florida in 1565. Santa Fe, New Mexico also predates Jamestown, Virginia (of Pocahontas fame, founded in 1607) and Plymouth Colony (of Mayflower, Pilgrims and Thanksgiving fame). In 1566 Pedro Menendez established Fort San Felipe on Santa Elena- which is present day Parris Island near Beaufort, South Carolina. The fort was part of the Spanish King's ongoing effort to establish a “Window on the Atlantic”. Spain needed a presence on the east coast of America to provide protection for the Spanish treasure galleons traveling back to Europe. From Santa Elena inland explorations, led by Captain Juan Pardo, were conducted in an attempt to establish an overland route from Mexico to Santa Elena, avoiding the pirate and French threat in the Caribbean. By 1571 Menendez had brought settlers, including farmers and craftsmen, and his own family to the settlement. Santa Elena was now the first European capitol on the American mainland, with Mendez as Governor. Santa Elena was a functioning settlement for 21 years, ending when Spain consolidated its Florida colony to St. Augustine. Later came Spanish settlements in San Antonio, Tucson, San Diego, Los Angeles and San Francisco, to name just a few. The Spanish even established a Jesuit mission in Virginia's Chesapeake Bay 37 years before the founding of Jamestown.

As a result of the persistent contributions made by Latinos to American culture, essential changes have resulted in the development of a complex national minority group that is now an important part of US society.

Two iconic American stories have Spanish antecedents, too. Almost 80 years before John Smith's alleged rescue by Pocahontas, a man by the name of Juan Ortiz told of his similar rescue from execution by an Indian girl. Spaniards also held a thanksgiving, 56 years before the Pilgrims, when they feasted near St. Augustine with Florida Indians, probably on stewed pork and garbanzo beans.

=== Spanish expeditions to the Pacific Northwest ===
Spanish claims to Alaska and the west coast of North America date to the Papal bull of 1493, and the Treaty of Tordesillas. In 1513, this claim was reinforced by Spanish explorer Vasco Núñez de Balboa, the first European to sight the Pacific Ocean when he claimed all lands adjoining this ocean for the Spanish Crown. Spain only started to colonize the claimed territory north of present-day Mexico in the 18th century, when it settled the northern coast of Las Californias (California). In the last decades of the 18th century a series of Spanish expeditions were undertaken along the north-west coasts of North America, including Oregon, Washington, British Columbia and Alaska. In the 19th century the Spanish explorer Manuel Lisa, first settler of Nebraska, left St. Louis, Missouri to head northwest toward Montana, inaugurating the Oregon Trail. The Spanish moved from Western Missouri to eastern Montana, and along the Yellowstone to western and southern Montana.

== Hispanic American presence in the former British colonies of the United States at the end of the eighteenth century ==
1790 U.S. Ancestry Based on Evaluated census figures
Ancestry group	Number (1790 estimate)	% of total
English	1,900,000	47.5
African	750,000	19.0
Scotch-Irish	320,000	8.0
German	280,000	7.0
Irish	200,000	5.0
Scottish	160,000	4.0
Welsh	120,000	3.0
Dutch	100,000	2.5
French	80,000	2.0
Native American	50,000	1.0
Spanish	20,000	0.5 (Note: In the eighteen century, Spanish America and the Philippines belonged to the Spanish Crown. So the inhabitants of Latin America and Filipinas were considered "Spanish". Possibly, many of the people registered as "Spanish" en the 1790 Census were from these places. Indeed, some of the Latin Americans living in the former British colonies at end of eighteen century were Venezuelans.)
Swedish and other	20,000	0.5
Total	4,000,000	100

Some Hispanics emigrated to some of the future British colonies of North America in the early of the 17th century. Among these immigrants was the Dominican Juan Rodriguez, who arrived in present-day New York City in 1613, as he was a member of the crew of a Dutch ship, and lived there for some time. He was the first non-Native American to reside in the region. Many others emigrated in the 18th century. Migration to eastern North America continued when the colonies gained independence from the UK. So between end of this century and early of nineteenth century emigrated people of origins such as the Spanish, Venezuelan and Honduran to the United States. A notable case is that of the Spanish merchant Pedro Casanave, who emigrated to Georgetown, in present-day Washington, D.C., in 1785. He served as the fifth mayor of Georgetown and presided over the ceremonial laying of the cornerstone of the White House, on October 12, 1792. Another member of the Casanave family, Juan de Miralles, was a prominent Spanish arms dealer who lived in New Jersey.

Using comparative approaches developed for urban areas, researchers compare and statistically model changes in the family income established Hispanic, rapidly growing Hispanic, rapidly growing non-Hispanic, and slow-growth or declining counties. The findings support perspectives that emphasize growing social heterogeneity in understanding how minority population growth contributes to inequality, including changes in human capital and industrial restructuring.

According to the United States Census of 1790, which was the first census of the whole United States, there were 20,000 people of Hispanic origin living in the former British colonies in that year. However, the census Bureau estimated the origins of the population based on their surnames.

On the other hand, between 1779 and 1783 several Spanish troops provided aid to the Americans in their fight against the British Crown's troops in the American Revolutionary War. In addition, some Spaniards living in the U.S. joined the American troops during the war. Maybe the more notable case was starred by Jorge Farragut, the Spanish lieutenant of the South Carolina Navy in the war. He settled in Tennessee and his son, David Farragut, stood out in the American Civil War.

== Florida ==
Juan Ponce de León, a Spanish conquistador, named Florida in honor of his arrival there on April 2, 1513, during Pascua Florida, a Spanish term for the Easter season. From that date forward, the land became known as "La Florida." (Juan Ponce de León may not have been the first European to reach Florida. At least one native that he encountered in Florida in 1513 could speak Spanish. Alternatively, the Spanish-speaking native could have been in contact with areas where Spanish settlements already existed, and Ponce de León found Florida first).

Over the following century, both the Spanish and French established settlements in Florida, with varying degrees of success. In 1559, Spanish Pensacola was established by Don Tristán de Luna y Arellano as the first European settlement in the continental United States, but it had become abandoned by 1561 and would not be reinhabited until the 1690s. French Huguenots founded Fort Caroline in modern-day Jacksonville in 1564, but this fort was conquered by forces from the new Spanish colony of St. Augustine the following year. After Huguenot leader Jean Ribault had learned of the new Spanish threat, he launched an expedition to sack the Spanish settlement; en route, however, severe storms at sea waylaid the expedition, which consisted of most of the colony's men, allowing St. Augustine founder Pedro Menéndez de Avilés time to march his men over land and conquer Fort Caroline. Most of the Huguenots were slaughtered, and Menéndez de Avilés marched south and captured the survivors of the wrecked French fleet, ordering all but a few Catholics executed beside a river subsequently called Matanzas (Spanish for 'killings'). When St. Augustine, Florida was established by Pedro Menéndez de Avilés, and hundreds of Spanish-Cuban soldiers and their families moved from Cuba to St. Augustine to establish a new life in 1565. St. Augustine came to serve as the capitals of the British and Spanish colonies of East and West Florida, respectively. The Spanish never had a firm hold on Florida, and maintained tenuous control over the region by converting the local tribes, briefly with Jesuits and later with Franciscan friars. The local leaders (caciques) demonstrated their loyalty to the Spanish by converting to Roman Catholicism and welcoming the Franciscan priests into their villages.

The area of Spanish Florida diminished with the establishment of English colonies to the north and French colonies to the west. The English weakened Spanish power in the area by supplying their Creek Indian allies with firearms and urging them to raid the Timucuan and Apalachee client-tribes of the Spanish. The English attacked St. Augustine, burning the city and its cathedral to the ground several times, while the citizens hid behind the walls of the Castillo de San Marcos. The Spanish, meanwhile, encouraged slaves to flee the English-held Carolinas and come to Florida, where they were converted to Roman Catholicism and given freedom. They settled in a buffer community north of St. Augustine, called Gracia Real de Santa Teresa de Mose, the first completely black settlement in what would become the United States. Great Britain gained control of Florida diplomatically in 1763 through the Peace of Paris (the Castillo de San Marcos surrendered for the first time, having never been taken militarily). Britain tried to develop Florida through the importation of immigrants for labor, including some from Menorca and Greece, but this project ultimately failed. Spain regained Florida in the Treaty of Versailles (1783) after helping defeat Britain in the American Revolutionary War. Finally, in 1819, by terms of the Adams–Onís Treaty, Spain ceded Florida to the United States in exchange for the American renunciation of any claims on Texas. On March 3, 1845, Florida became the 27th state of the United States of America.

== Louisiana ==
In 1763, France ceded Louisiana to Spain as compensation for the loss of Florida, which had been ceded to the British in 1763 after losing the Seven Years' War (Spain and France were allies). The Government of Louisiana resided in New Orleans, the capital of Lower Louisiana, but had representatives (or "commandants") in Saint Louis, Missouri, the capital of Upper Louisiana (also named Illinois Country). During Louisiana's Spanish period, many Spanish settlers emigrated to the region, such as the father of explorer and fur trader Manuel Lisa, who came from Murcia, Spain. However, the best-known Spanish emigration of the period took place between 1778 and 1783, when the Governor of Louisiana, Bernardo de Gálvez, recruited groups from the Canary Islands and Málaga and sent them to Louisiana to populate areas of New Orleans. More than 2,100 Canarians and 500 natives of Málaga emigrated to Louisiana during this period. In 1800, Spain returned Louisiana to France, although it was sold to the United States in 1803. The descendants of the Spanish settlers still live there.

== California (1530–1765) ==
The first European explorers, flying the flags of Spain, sailed along the coast of California from the early 16th to the mid-18th centuries, but no European settlements were established. The most important colonial power, Spain, focused attention on its imperial centers in Mexico, Peru, and the Philippines. Confident of Spanish claims to all lands touching the Pacific Ocean (including California), Spain simply sent an occasional exploring party sailing along the California coast. The California seen by these ship-bound explorers was one of hilly grasslands and forests, with few apparent resources or natural ports to attract colonists.

The other colonial states of the era, with their interest on more densely populated areas, paid limited attention to this distant part of the world. It was not until the middle of the 18th century, that both Russian and British explorers and fur-traders began encroaching on the margins of the area.

=== Hernán Cortés ===
About 1530, Nuño Beltrán de Guzmán (President of New Spain) was told by an Indian slave of the Seven Cities of Cibola that had streets paved with gold and silver. About the same time, Hernán Cortés was attracted by stories of a wonderful country far to the northwest, populated by Amazonish women and abounding with gold, pearls, and gems. The Spaniards conjectured that these places may be one and the same.

An expedition in 1533 discovered a bay, most likely that of La Paz, before experiencing difficulties and returning. Cortés accompanied expeditions in 1534 and 1535 without finding the sought-after city.

On May 3, 1535, Cortés claimed "Santa Cruz Island" (now known as the peninsula of Baja California), and laid out and founded the city that was to become La Paz later that spring.

=== Francisco de Ulloa ===
In July 1539, moved by the renewal of those stories, Cortés sent Francisco de Ulloa out with three small vessels. He made it to the mouth of the Colorado, then sailed around the peninsula as far as Cedros Island.

The account of this voyage marks the first recorded application of the name "California". It can be traced to the fifth volume of a chivalric romance, Amadis de Gallia, arranged by Garci Rodríguez de Montalvo and first printed around 1510, in which a character traveled through an island called "California".

=== João Rodrigues Cabrilho ===
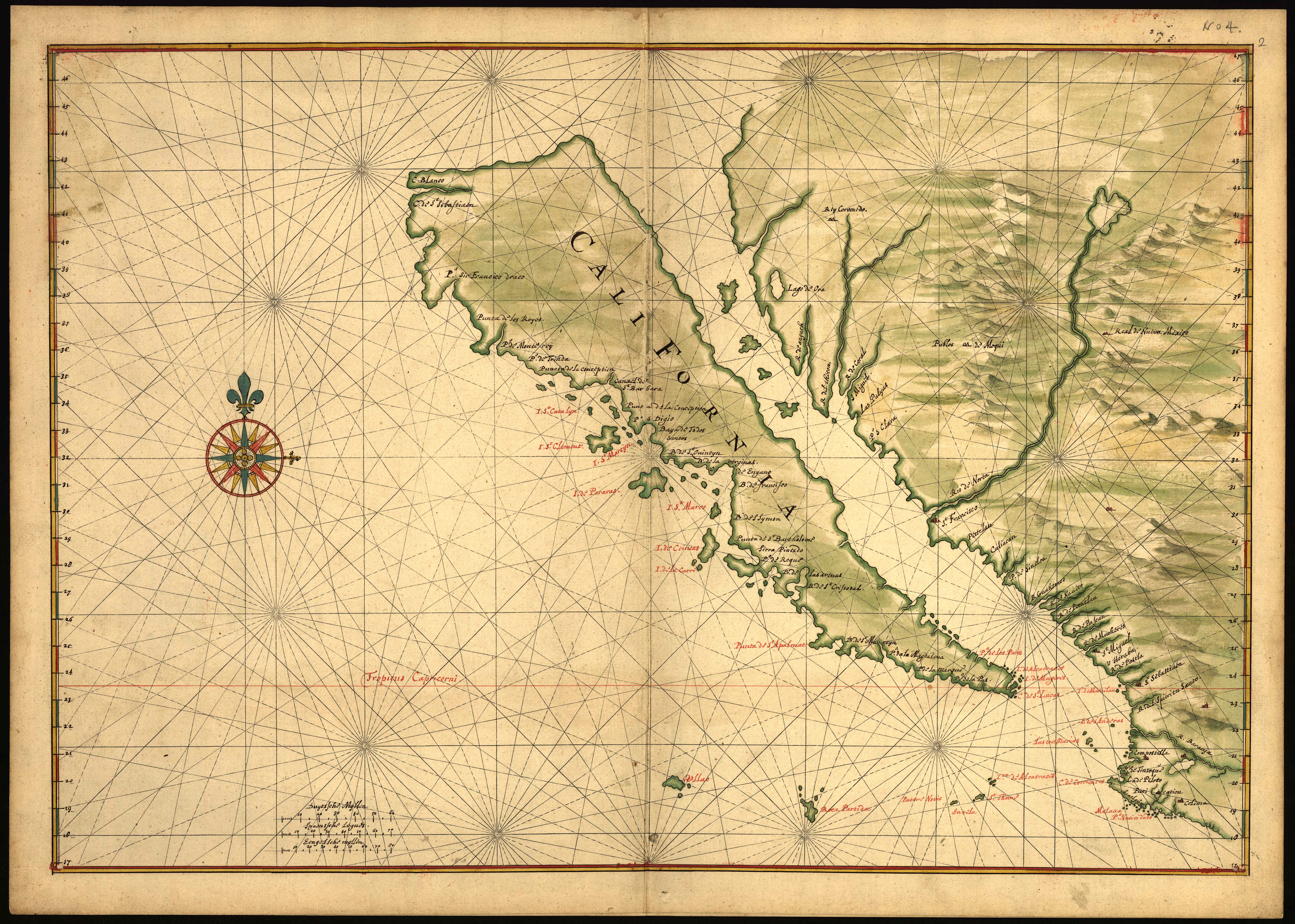
California is shown as an island on this 1650 map. The smaller islands located in the "channel" were mentioned in an early myth and subsequently included by mapmakers over the centuries who took it on faith that region had actually been explored.

The first European to explore the coast was João Rodrigues Cabrilho, a Portuguese navigator sailing for the Spanish Crown. In June, 1542 Cabrillo led an expedition in two ships from the west coast of what is now Mexico. He landed on September 28 at San Diego Bay, claiming what he thought was the Island of California for Spain.

Cabrillo and his crew landed on San Miguel, one of the Channel Islands, then continued north in an attempt to discover a supposed coastal route to the mainland of Asia. Cabrillo likely sailed as far north as Pt. Reyes (north of San Francisco), but died as the result of an accident during this voyage; the remainder of the expedition, which likely reached as far north as the Rogue River in today's southern Oregon was led by Bartolomé Ferrer.

=== Sebastián Vizcaíno ===
In 1602, the Spaniard Sebastián Vizcaíno explored California's coastline as far north as Monterey Bay, where he put ashore. He ventured inland south along the coast, and recorded a visit to what is likely Carmel Bay. His major contributions to the state's history were the glowing reports of the Monterey area as an anchorage and as land suitable for settlement, as well as the detailed charts he made of the coastal waters (which were used for nearly 200 years).

== Spanish colonization and governance (1765–1821) ==
During the last quarter of the 18th century, the first European settlements were established in California. Reacting to interest by Russia and possibly Great Britain in the fur-bearing animals of the Pacific coast, Spain created a series of Catholic missions, accompanied by troops and ranches, along the southern and central coast of California. These missions were intended to demonstrate the claim of the Spanish Crown to modern-day California.

The first quarter of the 19th century continued the slow colonization of the southern and central California coast by Spanish missionaries, ranchers, and troops. By 1820, Spanish influence was marked by the chain of missions reaching from San Diego to just north of today's San Francisco Bay area, and extended inland approximately 25 to 50 miles from the missions. Outside of this zone, perhaps 200,000 to 250,000 Native Americans were continuing to lead traditional lives. The Adams–Onís Treaty, signed in 1819 set the northern boundary of the Spanish claims at the 42nd parallel, effectively creating today's northern boundary of California.

=== First Spanish colonies ===
Spain had maintained a number of missions and presidios in its richer lands (not including California) since 1493. The Spanish claims to the Northern provinces of New Spain, excluding Santa Fe in New Mexico, were essentially ignored for almost 250 years. It wasn't until the threat of an incursion by Russia coming down from Alaska in 1765, however, that King Charles III of Spain felt such installations were necessary in Upper ("Alta") California. By then the Spanish empire could only afford a minimal effort. Alta California was to be settled by Franciscan friars protected by a few troops in California Missions. Between 1774 and 1791, the Crown sent forth a number of small expeditions to further explore and settle California and possibly the Pacific Northwest.

=== Gaspar de Portolà ===
In May 1768, the Spanish Visitor General, José de Gálvez, planned a four-prong expedition to settle Alta California, two by sea and two by land, which Gaspar de Portolà volunteered to command.

The Portolá land expedition arrived at the site of present-day San Diego on June 29, 1769, where it established the Presidio of San Diego. Eager to press on to Monterey Bay, de Portolá and his group, consisting of Juan Crespí, sixty-three leather-jacket soldiers and a hundred mules, headed north on July 14. They moved quickly, reaching the present-day sites of Los Angeles on August 2, Santa Monica on August 3, Santa Barbara on August 19, San Simeon on September 13 and the mouth of the Salinas River on Octob. Although they were looking for Monterey Bay, the group failed to recognize it when they reached it.

On October 31, de Portolá's explorers became the first Europeans known to view San Francisco Bay. Ironically, the Manila Galleons had sailed along this coast for almost 200 years by then. The group returned to San Diego in 1770.

=== Junípero Serra ===
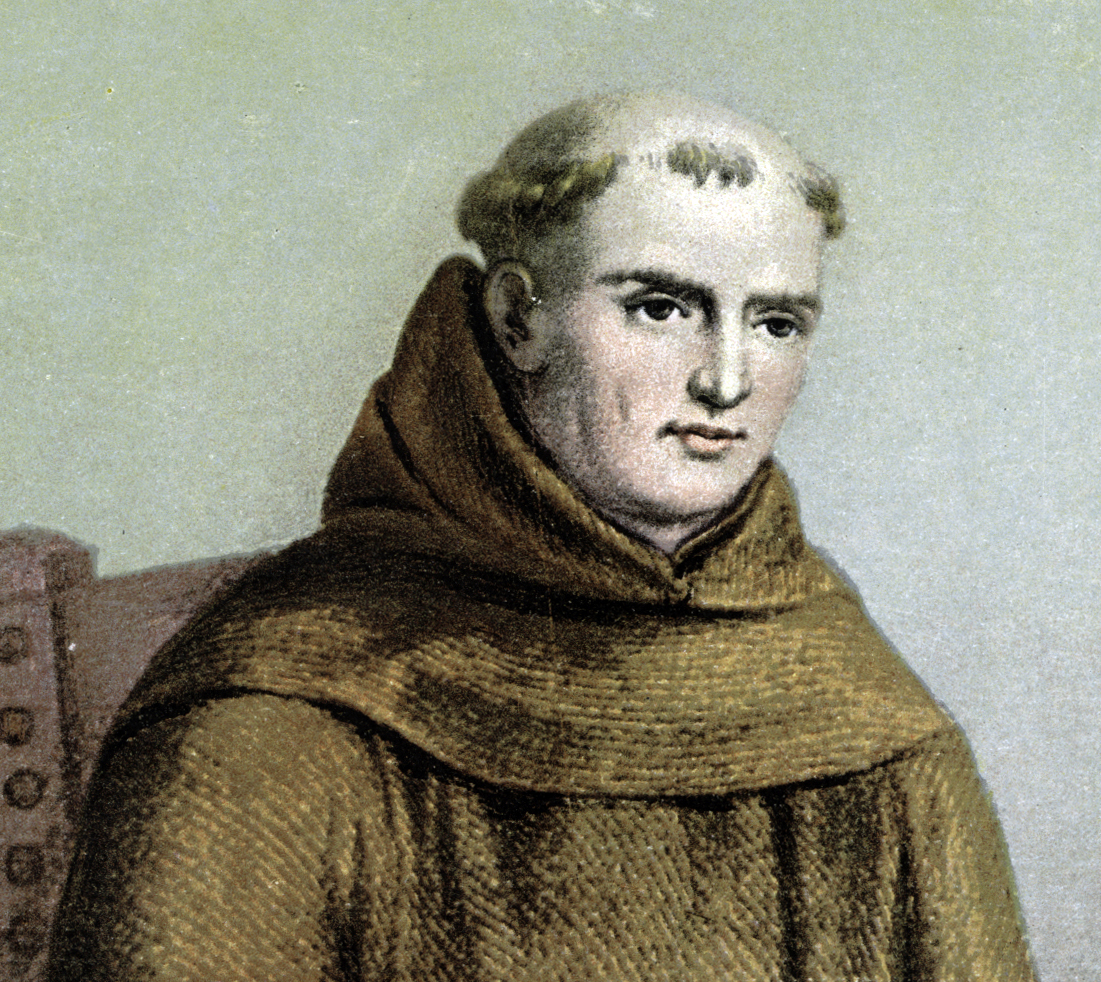
A portrait of Junípero Serra

Junípero Serra was a Mallorcan (Spain) Franciscan who founded the Alta California mission chain. After King Carlos III ordered the Jesuits expelled from "New Spain" on February 3, 1768, Serra was named "Father Presidente."

Serra founded San Diego de Alcalá in 1769. Later that year, Serra, Governor de Portolà and a small group of men moved north, up the Pacific Coast. They reached Monterey in 1770, where Serra founded the second Alta California mission, San Carlos Borromeo.

=== Alta California missions ===
The California Missions comprise a series of religious outposts established by Spanish Catholic Dominicans, Jesuits, and Franciscans, to spread the Christian doctrine among the local Native Americans, but with the added benefit of confirming historic Spanish claims to the area. The missions introduced European livestock, fruits, vegetables, and industry into the California region.

Most missions were small, with normally two Franciscans and six to eight soldiers in residence. All of these buildings were built largely with unpaid native labor under Franciscan supervision. In addition to the presidio (royal fort) and pueblo (town), the misión was one of the three major agencies employed by the Spanish crown in an attempt to consolidate its colonial territories. None of these missions were completely self-supporting, requiring continued (albeit modest) financial support. Starting with the onset of the Mexican War of Independence in 1810, this support largely disappeared and the missions and their converts were left on their own.

In order to facilitate overland travel, the mission settlements were situated approximately 30 miles (48 kilometers) apart, so that they were separated by one day's long ride on horseback along the 600-mile (966-kilometer) long El Camino Real (Spanish for "The Royal Highway", though often referred to as "The King's Highway"), and also known as the California Mission Trail. Heavy freight movement was practical only via water. Tradition has it that the priests sprinkled mustard seeds along the trail in order to mark it with bright yellow flowers.

Four presidios, strategically placed along the California coast and organized into separate military districts, served to protect the missions and other Spanish settlements in Upper California.

A number of mission structures survive today or have been rebuilt, and many have congregations established since the beginning of the 20th century. The highway and missions have become for many a romantic symbol of an idyllic and peaceful past. The "Mission Revival Style" was an architectural movement that drew its inspiration from this idealized view of California's past.

=== Ranchos ===
The Spanish (and later the Mexicans) encouraged settlement with large land grants which were turned into ranchos, where cattle and sheep were raised. Cow hides (at roughly $1 each) and fat (known as tallow, used to make candles as well as soaps) were the primary exports of California until the mid-19th century. The owners of these ranchos styled themselves after the landed gentry in Spain. Their workers included some Native Americans who had learned to speak Spanish and ride horses.

== Mexican era (1821–1846) ==
=== General ===
Substantial changes occurred during the second quarter of the 19th century. Mexican independence from Spain in 1821 marked the end of European rule in California; the missions faded in importance under Mexican control while ranching and trade increased. By the mid-1840s, the increased presence of White Americans made the northern part of the state diverge from southern California, where the Spanish-speaking "Californios" dominated.

By 1846, California had a Spanish-speaking population of under 10,000, tiny even compared to the sparse population of states in Mexico proper. The "Californios", as they were known, consisted of about 800 families, mostly concentrated on a few large ranchos. About 1,300 White Americans and a very mixed group of about 500 Europeans, scattered mostly from Monterey to Sacramento dominated trading as the Californios dominated ranching. In terms of adult males, the two groups were about equal, but the Americans were more recent arrivals.

=== Secularization ===
The Mexican Congress passed An Act for the Secularization of the Missions of California on August 17, 1833. Mission San Juan Capistrano was the very first to feel the effects of this legislation the following year. The Franciscans soon thereafter abandoned the missions, taking with them most everything of value, after which the locals typically plundered the mission buildings for construction materials.

=== Other nationalities ===
- In this period, American and British trappers began entering California in search of beaver. Using the Siskiyou Trail, Old Spanish Trail, and later, the California Trail, these trapping parties arrived in California, often without the knowledge or approval of the Mexican authorities, and laid the foundation for the arrival of later Gold Rush era Forty-Niners, farmers and ranchers.
- In 1840, the American adventurer, writer and lawyer Richard Henry Dana Jr. wrote of his experiences aboard ship off California in the 1830s in Two Years Before the Mast.
- The leader of a French scientific expedition to California, Eugene Duflot de Mofras, wrote in 1840 "...it is evident that California will belong to whatever nation chooses to send there a man-of-war and two hundred men." In 1841, General Vallejo wrote Governor Alvarado that "...there is no doubt that France is intriguing to become mistress of California", but a series of troubled French governments did not uphold French interests in the area. During disagreements with Mexicans, the German-Swiss Francophile John Sutter threatened to raise the French flag over California and place himself and his settlement, New Helvetia, under French protection.

By 1846, the province had a non-Native American population of about 1500 Californio adult men (with about 6500 women and children), who lived mostly in the southern half. About 2,000 recent immigrants (almost all adult men) lived mostly in the northern half of California.

== Arizona and New Mexico ==
=== Arizona ===
==== Spanish period ====
Most of the colonists left Arizona after Juan Bautista de Anza announced that the area was not rich in raw material; however, several settlers stayed and became subsistence farmers. During the mid-18th century, the pioneers of Arizona attempted to expand their territory northward, but were prevented from doing so by the Tohono O'odham and Apache Native Americans, who had begun raiding their villages for livestock.

In 1765, Charles III of Spain doing a major rearranging of the presidios (military fortresses) on the northern frontier. The Jesuits were expelled from the area, and the Franciscans took their place at their missions. In the 1780s and 1790s, the Spanish began a plan of setting up Apache peace camps and providing the Apache with rations so that they would not attack, allowing the Spanish to expand northward.

==== Mexican period ====
In 1821, Mexico gained independence from Spain, annexing the southwest of the present United States, including Arizona. As missions began to wither, Mexico began auctioning off more land, causing the Pimería Alta and the Apachería to shrink as territory expanded. In the meantime, American mountain men began to enter the region, looking to trap beavers for their pelts. In 1836, Texas declared independence from Mexico and claimed much of the territory in the northern lands of Mexico. When the United States annexed Texas in 1846 over the strong objections of the Mexican government, U.S. troops moved into disputed territory. The hostilities erupted in the Mexican–American War (1846–1848). The U.S. occupied Mexico City and forced the newly founded Mexican Republic to give up its northern half, including the later Arizona.

=== New Mexico ===
The settlement began on July 11, 1598, the Spanish explorer Juan de Oñate came north from Mexico to New Mexico with 500 Spanish settlers and soldiers and a livestock formed by 7,000 animals. They founded San Juan de los Caballeros, the first Spanish settlement in New Mexico. Onate also conquered the territories of Puebloan peoples and he became the first governor of New Mexico. 12 years later, the Pueblo Indian revolt forced the flight of the settlers and their descendants in New Mexico, but they returned to the province in 1692, when Diego de Vargas became the new governor of New Mexico. At that time, New Mexico was under the jurisdiction of the Audiencia of Guadalajara and belonging to the Viceroyalty of New Spain. However, with the creation in 1777 of the Commandancy General of the Provinces was included only in the jurisdiction of the Commandant-General. The mainland part of New Spain won independence from Spain in 1821 and in 1824 joined New Mexico to Mexico, belonging to same country .

== Texas ==
=== Spanish period ===
Alonso Alvarez de Pineda claimed Texas for Spain in 1519. The main unifying factor for these separate regions was their shared responsibility of defending the Tejas frontier. The first Tejano settlers were 15 families from the Canary Islands arrived in 1731. Their family units were among the first to settle at the Presidio of San Antonio. Soon after, they established the first civil government in Texas at La Villa de San Fernando. The Nacogdoches settlement was located in the North Texas region. Tejanos from Nacogdoches traded with the French and Anglo residents of Louisiana, and were culturally influenced by them. The third settlement was located North of the Rio Grande toward the Nueces River. These Southern ranchers were citizens of Spanish origin from Tamaulipas and Northern Mexico, and identified with both Spanish and Mexican culture. 1821, Agustin de Iturbide launched a drive for Mexican Independence. Texas became a part of the newly independent nation without a shot being fired.

=== Mexican period ===
In 1821 at the end of the Mexican War of Independence, there were about 4,000 Tejanos living in what is now the state of Texas alongside a lesser number of immigrants. In the 1820s many settlers from the United States and other nations moved to Texas from the United States. By 1830, the 30,000 settlers in Texas outnumbered the Tejanos six to one. The Texians and Tejanos alike rebelled against the attempts of centralist authority of Mexico City and the measures implemented by Santa Anna. Tensions between the central Mexican government and the settlers eventually led to the Texas Revolution. After the revolution, many were dismayed by the treatments they received at the hands of Texians/Anglos, who suspected and accused the Tejanos of sabotage and of aiding Santa Anna.

== United States era (beginning 1846) ==
=== Mexican Cession ===
When war was declared on May 13, 1846, between the United States and Mexico, it took almost two months (mid-July 1846) for definite word of war to get to California. Units from the U.S.Army and Navy were poised to invade, and easily captured California against scattered resistance. Within days they controlled San Francisco, Sonoma, and Sutter's Fort in Sacramento as Mexican General Castro and Governor Pio Pico fled from Los Angeles.

The Treaty of Guadalupe Hidalgo, signed on February 2, 1848, marked the end of the Mexican–American War. In that treaty, the United States agreed to pay Mexico $18,250,000; Mexico formally ceded California (and other northern territories) to the United States, and a new international boundary was drawn; San Diego Bay is the only natural harbor in California south of San Francisco, and to claim all this strategic water, the border was slanted to include it. About 10,000 Californios of Spanish descent lived in California, nearly all in the south. They were granted full American citizenship and voting rights. However the California Gold Rush, in the north, brought in over 100,000 men who far outnumbered the resident Californios. California became a state in 1850. Moreover, although the United States had promised to respect Mexican American property rights, the financial stability of the original Californio-Mexican residents decreased substantially due to elevated land values in the late 1860s and 1870s, high-interest loans and taxes, all of which contributed to widespread property loss and marginalization.

== Incorporation of the Hispanic people ==
The Mexican–American War, followed by the Treaty of Guadalupe Hidalgo in 1848 and the Gadsden Purchase in 1853, extended U.S. control over a wide range of territory once held by Spain and later Mexico, including the present day states of New Mexico, Colorado, Utah, Nevada, Arizona, and California. The vast majority of Hispanic populations chose to stay and become full US citizens. Although the treaty promised that the landowners in this newly acquired territory would enjoy full protection of their property as if they were citizens of the United States, many former citizens of Mexico lost their land in lawsuits before state and federal courts or as a result of legislation passed after the treaty. Even those statutes intended to protect the owners of property at the time of the extension of the United States' borders, such as the 1851 California Land Act, had the effect of dispossessing Californio owners ruined by the cost of maintaining litigation over land titles for years.

The loss of property rights in New Mexico created a largely landless population that resented the powers that had taken their land. After the Santa Fe Ring succeeded in dispossessing thousands of landholders in New Mexico, groups such as Las Gorras Blancas tore down fences or burned down interlopers' farm buildings. In western Texas the political struggle even sparked an armed conflict in which the Tejano majority briefly forced the surrender of the Texas Rangers, but in the end lost much of their previous influence, offices, and economic opportunities.

In other areas, particularly California, the settled Hispanic residents were simply overwhelmed by the large number of Anglo settlers who rushed in, first in Northern California as a result of the California Gold Rush, then decades later by the boom in Southern California. Many Anglos turned to farming and moved, often illegally, onto the land granted to Californios by the old Mexican government.

During the California Gold Rush, at least 25,000 Mexicans, as well thousands of Chileans, Peruvians, and other Hispanics immigrated to California. Many of these Hispanics were experienced miners and had great success mining gold in California. Many of these new Americans eventually rose to prominence within larger California society. However, in other cases, their initial success aroused animosity by rival groups of Anglo prospectors, who often intimidated Hispanic miners with the threat of violence and even committed violence against some. Consistent with the predominant racial attitudes of 19th century America, Anglo miners often drove Hispanic miners out of their camps, and barred Hispanics, along with Irish, Chinese, and other traditionally "non-Anglo" groups, from testifying in court and generally imposed exclusionary standards similar to Jim Crow laws in the case of African-Americans. Between 1848 and 1860, at least 163 Mexicans were lynched in California alone.

In addition to California, many Mexicans immigrated to other places of Southwest (mainly Arizona, New Mexico and Texas) since 1852. Also many Colombians, Paraguayans (who emigrated to the United States since 1841), Chileans and Cubans emigrated to several places of the United States during the nineteenth. The more numerous were the Cubans. 100,000 Cubans (belonging to all social and racial groups) emigrated to the United States (mostly to Florida) during this period. In 1861-65 many Hispanics fought in the American Civil War, on both the Union and Confederate sides, although not all of them lived in the US.

Despite integration, Hispanic Americans managed to retain their culture. They were most successful in those areas where they had retained some measure of political or economic power, where Jim Crow laws imposed a forced isolation or where they made up a significant percentage of the community.

== Recent immigration ==
Following the Spanish–American War, in 1898 Spain ceded Puerto Rico and Cuba to the United States in the Treaty of Paris. Cuba gained independence from the United States in 1902 and Puerto Rico became a commonwealth of the United States in 1917, so that Puerto Ricans were able to emigrate to the United States easily because of their American citizenship. During the 20th century many Hispanic immigrants came to United States fleeing the poverty, violence, and military dictatorships of Latin America. Ironically, the United States government was responsible for many of these dictatorships because of its foreign policy, which frequently involved covert as well as overt interventions such as military coups that toppled democratically elected presidents. The U.S. supported the ensuing regimes, which arrested, tortured, exiled, and murdered civilians opposed to them. Those who fled these countries emigrated mainly to Southwest, New York, New Jersey, Illinois and Florida, although the Hispanics emigrated through the country. Most Hispanics who immigrate to the United States are Mexicans, Puerto Ricans, Cubans and Salvadorans. There are currently over a million descendants of the last four groups in the United States. Throughout the twentieth century, the Hispanic population has been characterized by a high population growth, both for the emigration and the birth rate.

== Historical demographics ==
Hispanic population in the United States 1850–2010
Year	Population (millions)	%±	Percent of the U.S. population
1850	116,943	—	0.6%
1860	155,000	—	
1870	200,000	—	
1880	393,555	—	0.8%
1890	401,491 (Mexican Americans)	+336.5%	
1900	503,189	+27.8%	0.7%
1910	797,994	+58.6%	0.9%
1920	1,286,154	+61.2%	1.2%
1930	1.7	+28.6%	1.3%
1940	2,021,820	+22.2%	1.5%
1950	3,231,409	+59.8%	2.1%
1960	5,814,784	+79.9%	3.2%
1970	8,920,940	+53.4%	4.4%
1980	14,608,673	+63.8%	6.4%
1990	22,354,059	+53.0%	9.0%
2000	35,305,818	+57.9%	12.5%
2010	50,477,594	+43.0%	16.3%
2020	62,080,044	+23.0%	18.7%

Projections 2030–2060
Year	Population (millions)	%±	Percent of the U.S. population
2030	78.7	+22.1%	21.9%
2040	94.9	+19.2%	25.0%
2050	111.7	+22.7%	27.9%
2060	128.8	+22.7%	30.6%

== See also ==
- Cuban Americans
- History of Mexican Americans
- Puerto Ricans
- Criticism of the term Hispanic
- Panamanian Americans
- Alta California
- Santa Fe de Nuevo México
- Spain and the American Revolutionary War

== Bibliography ==
=== Surveys ===
- Bean, Frank D., and Marta Tienda. The Hispanic Population of the United States (1987), statistical analysis of demography and social structure
- Chabran, Richard, and Rafael Chabran. The Latino Encyclopedia (6 vol. 1996)
- De Leon, Arnoldo, and Richard Griswold Del Castillo. North to Aztlan: A History of Mexican Americans in the United States (2006)
- Gomez, Laura E. Manifest Destinies: The Making of the Mexican American Race (2008)
- Gomez-Quiñones, Juan. Mexican American Labor, 1790-1990. (1994).
- Gonzales, Manuel G. Mexicanos: A History of Mexicans in the United States (2nd ed 2009) excerpt and text search
- Gutiérrez, David G. ed. The Columbia History of Latinos in the United States Since 1960 (2004) 512pp excerpt and text search
- Meier, Matt S. Notable Latino Americans: A Biographical Dictionary (1997) 431pp; 127 longer biographies excerpt and text search
- Meier, Matt S. Mexican American The biographies: A Historical Dictionary, 1836-1987 (1988) 237pp; 270 shortwer biographies
- Ruiz, Vicki L. From Out of the Shadows: Mexican Women in Twentieth-Century America (1998)
- Vargas, Zaragosa. Crucible of Struggle: A History of Mexican Americans from the Colonial Period to the Present Era (2010)
- Weber, David J. Spanish Frontier in North America (Yale University Press, 1992; brief edition 2009)
- Weber, David J. New Spain's Far Northern Frontier: Essays on Spain in the American West, 1540-1821 (University of New Mexico Press, 1979).

=== Historiography ===
- Babcock, Matthew. "Territoriality and the Historiography of Early North America." Journal of American Studies 50.3 (2016): 515–536. online
- Castañeda, Antonia I. "Gender, race, and culture: Spanish-Mexican women in the historiography of frontier California." Frontiers: A Journal of Women Studies 11.1 (1990): 8-20.
- De Leon, Arnoldo, and Carlos E. Cuéllar. "Chicanos in the City: A Review of the Monographic Literature," The History Teacher (1996) 29#3 pp. 363–378 in JSTOR
- Garcia, Richard A. "Changing Chicano Historiography," Reviews in American History 34.4 (2006) 521–528 in Project MUSE
- Poyo, Gerald E., and Gilberto M. Hinojosa. "Spanish Texas and borderlands historiography in transition: Implications for United States history." Journal of American History 75.2 (1988): 393-416 online.
- Rochín, Refugio I., and Denis N. Valdés, eds. Voices of a New Chicana/o History. (2000). 307 pp. 14 articles by scholars
- Ruiz, Vicki L. "Nuestra América: Latino History as United States History," Journal of American History, 93 (Dec. 2006), 655–72.
- Weber, David J. "The Spanish legacy in North America and the historical imagination." Western Historical Quarterly 23.1 (1992): 4-24. online
- Weber, David J. "The Spanish Borderlands, Historiography Redux." The History Teacher (2005) 39#1:43-56 online.
