= McPherson (disambiguation) =

McPherson is a surname.

McPherson may also refer to:

== People ==
- McPherson Meade, Montserratian cricketer
- Rosamond McPherson "Roz" Young (1912–2005), American columnist, author, educator and historian
- Graham McPherson (1961), a.k.a. Suggs, singer-songwriter, musician, radio personality and actor

== Places ==
=== In the United States ===
==== Specific locations ====
- McPherson College, a liberal arts college in Kansas
- McPherson Museum, a local history museum in McPherson, Kansas
- McPherson Square, a public square in Washington, D.C.
- McPherson Square (Washington Metro), a station on the Washington Metro
- McPherson Town Historic District, a neighborhood of Dayton, Ohio

==== Towns ====
- Fort McPherson, Georgia, a US Army military base
- McPherson, Kansas, in McPherson County
- McPherson Township, Sherman County, Kansas
- McPherson Township, Blue Earth County, Minnesota

==== Counties ====
- McPherson County, Kansas
- McPherson County, Nebraska
- McPherson County, South Dakota

=== Elsewhere ===
- MacPherson, Singapore, a region of Singapore
- Division of McPherson, an Australian Electoral Division in Queensland
- Fort McPherson, Northwest Territories, a town in the Northwest Territories, Canada
- McPherson Range, a mountain range in Australia
- Macpherson Stadium and Macpherson Playground, in Hong Kong

== See also ==
- Macpherson, a surname
- McPhearson, a surname
