= John MacPherson =

John MacPherson or Macpherson may refer to:

- John Macpherson (minister) (1710–1765), Scottish minister and antiquarian
- Sir John Macpherson, 1st Baronet (1745–1821), Scottish administrator in India
- John Macpherson (physician) (1817–1890), Scottish physician
- John Alexander MacPherson (1833–1894), Australian politician
- John Andrew MacPherson (1856–1944), New Zealand politician, Liberal Party MP
- John Thomas Macpherson (1872–1921), British Member of Parliament for Preston, 1906–1910
- Sir John Stuart Macpherson (1898–1971), governor of Nigeria, 1948–1955
- John Macpherson (privateer), Scottish-born privateer

== See also ==
- John McPherson (disambiguation)
