= McPherson =

McPherson is a Scottish surname. It is an Anglicised form of the Gaelic Mac a' Phearsain and Mac a Phearsoin, meaning "son of the parson". Notable people with the surname include:

== In sports ==
- Adrian McPherson, American football player
- Alex McPherson, American football player
- Archie McPherson (footballer), Scottish footballer
- Bill McPherson (disambiguation), multiple people
- Cheryl McPherson (born 1963), Canadian curler
- Dallas McPherson, American baseball player
- Daniel McPherson, Australian rules footballer
- David McPherson (disambiguation), multiple people
- Don McPherson, American academic and football player
- Donald McPherson (figure skater), Canadian figure skater
- Evan McPherson (born 1999), American football player
- James McPherson (cricketer), (1842–1891), Australian cricketer
- Jessie McPherson (born 2002), Canadian ice hockey player
- John McPherson (disambiguation), multiple people
- Kristy McPherson, Professional golfer on the LPGA
- Lachlan McPherson (born 1900), Scottish footballer
- Robert McPherson (disambiguation), multiple people

== In politics and law ==
- Bruce McPherson, American politician
- Edward McPherson, American politician
- Ewan McPherson, Canadian politician and judge
- Harriet McPherson, American politician, farmer, and educator
- Heather McPherson (politician) (born 1972), Canadian politician
- James L. McPherson (1881–1951), Canadian politician
- Jim McPherson, Canadian politician
- Sir John Macpherson, 1st Baronet, Governor-General of Bengal
- Marquis Lafayette McPherson (1822–1871), American politician and lawyer from Iowa
- Newton Leroy McPherson, birth name of Newt Gingrich
- Sean McPherson, American politician
- Tom McPherson, American politician

== In music ==
- Casey McPherson, American musician from Austin (Texas)
- Charles McPherson, American saxophonist
- Dave McPherson (musician), English singer and guitarist for rock band InMe and drummer for metal band Centiment
- Gordon McPherson, Scottish songwriter
- Graham McPherson (better known as Suggs), British vocalist of the second-wave ska band Madness
- Greg McPherson, English singer and guitarist for metal band Centiment and bassist for rock band InMe
- JD McPherson, American musician
- Naomi McPherson, American guitarist and keyboardist for alternative band MUNA and, also, Charles McPherson's grandchild

== In the military ==
- Andrew McPherson (RAF officer), Scottish World War II pilot
- Donald M McPherson, United States Navy fighter ace
- James B. McPherson, an American general of the Union Army during the American Civil War
- Stewart McPherson (VC), a Scottish recipient of the Victoria Cross

== In theatre and literature ==
- Anna Talbott McPherson, American biographer and illustrator
- Conor McPherson, Irish playwright and director
- Heather McPherson (poet) (1942–2017), New Zealand feminist poet, publisher and editor
- James Alan McPherson, American novelist and short story writer
- James M. McPherson, American Civil War author and historian at Princeton University
- John Macpherson (minister), Scottish minister and antiquarian
- Neil McPherson (artistic director), British theatre director
- Rosamond McPherson "Roz" Young (1912–2005), American columnist, author, educator and historian

== In film and television ==
- Patricia McPherson (born 1954), American actress

== In business ==
- Lydia Starr McPherson (1827–1903), American newspaper writer, editor, and founder
- William McPherson Allen, president of the Boeing Company from 1945 to 1970

== Others ==
- Aimee Semple McPherson, American evangelist in the 1920s and 1930s
- Anna McPherson, Canadian physicist
- Burchell McPherson (1951–2026), Jamaican Roman Catholic prelate
- Lisa McPherson, scientologist who died while in the care of the Church of Scientology
- Stewart McPherson (geographer), British geographer

== See also ==
- McPhearson
- Macpherson
