= Heather McPherson =

Heather McPherson may refer to:

- Heather McPherson (poet) (1942–2017), New Zealand feminist poet and publisher
- Heather McPherson (politician) (born 1972), Canadian politician in Alberta

== See also ==
- McPherson
