= Samuel Charters Macpherson =

Scottish political agent in India

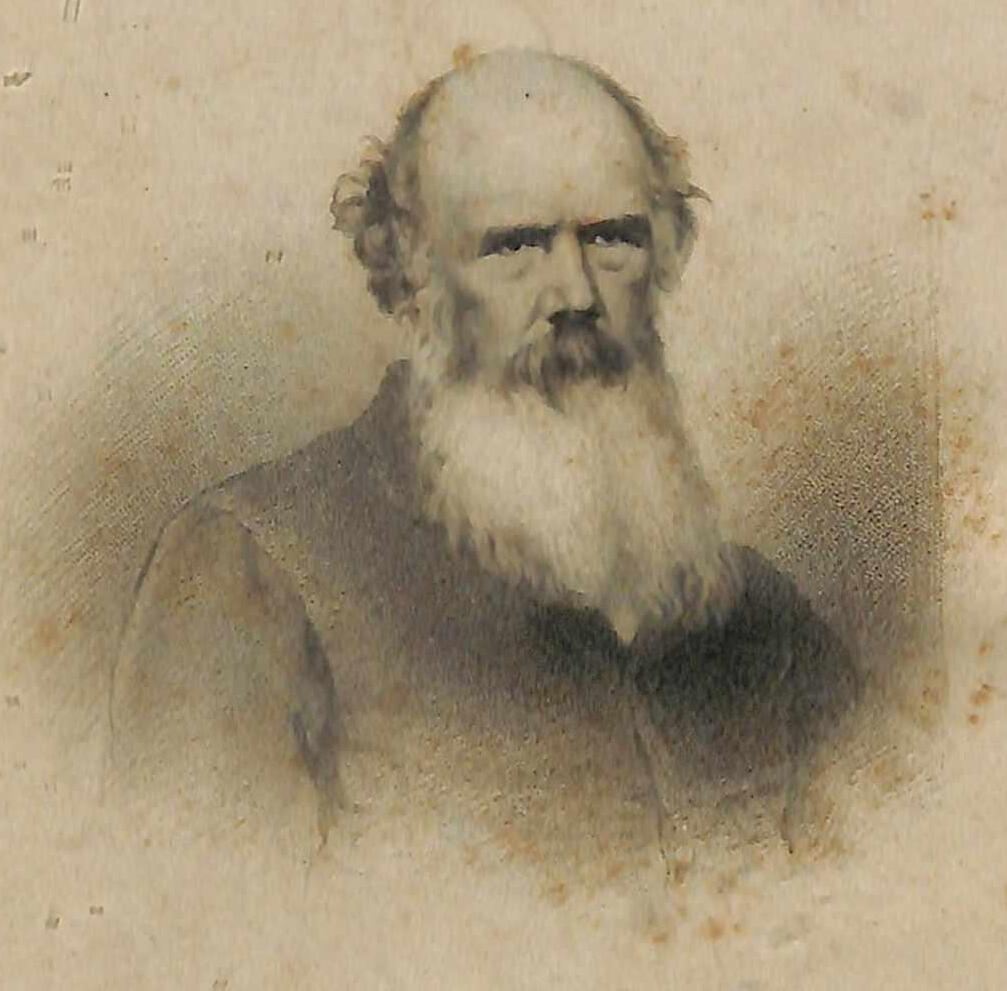
- Born: 7 January 1806; Old Aberdeen, Scotland
- Died: 15 April 1860 (aged 54)
- Occupation: Political agent

Samuel Charters Macpherson CB (7 January 1806 – 15 April 1860) was a Scottish political agent in India.

== Biography ==
Macpherson was born in Old Aberdeen on 7 January 1806. He was the elder brother of John Macpherson and William Macpherson. He was also the second son of Dr. Hugh Macpherson, a professor of Greek in King's College, Aberdeen, by his first wife, Anne Maria Charters. After studying at the college of Edinburgh in 1822–3, he passed two years at Trinity College, Cambridge; returned to Edinburgh to study for the Scottish bar, and, finding his eyes too weak, finally sailed to Madras as a cadet in 1827, becoming lieutenant in 1831; and captain by, brevet in 1841. He was first engaged in the trigonometrical surrey of India. Out in 1835, he was summoned to join his regiment (the 8th native infantry), which was engaged in operations against the rajah of Goomsur in Orissa (modern Odisha). In 1837, he was sent by the collector of Ganjam on a mission of survey and inquiry into the unexplored parts of Goomsur. Here he obtained much information respecting the language and institutions of the Khonds, a wild aboriginal tribe, then almost unknown. In May 1839, he was compelled by fever to recuperate at the Cape. On his return to Madras, he drew up for the governor-general (Lord Elphinstone) a report on the Khonds, and the measures to be adopted for the suppression among that people of the Meriah, or human sacrifices. This report formed the basis of a paper which he read before the Royal Asiatic Society in 1852. In the meantime, Captain (afterwards General) Campbell, assistant to the collector of Ganjam, had called together the chief men of the Khonds of Gumsur, and informed them that human sacrifices would no longer be tolerated by the company's government, and had compelled them to give up a number of intended victims. But neither Campbell nor his superior, Bannerman, made any real progress in suppressing the rite. In the spring of 1842, Campbell having gone to China on service with his regiment, Macpherson was appointed principal assistant to the collector and agent in Ganjam. His knowledge of the people and the influence he had acquired over them by personal intercourse enabled him to lay down a system for abolishing their practices of human sacrifice. He administered justice among them with unflagging industry; he strove to conciliate the curate, priests, and rajahs; he vigorously punished the Hindus who carried on the nefarious traffic of supplying victims to the Khonds; he constructed roads, encouraged fairs, and bestowed the Meriah girls in marriage on the most influential persons among the tribes, and made these alliances a passport to the favour of government. The result was that on 15 February 1844, he was able to write: 'The whole of the Goomsur Khond country ... is completely conquered, and by the use of moral influences alone.'

In the districts adjoining Goomsur he was less successful. The jealousy of his colleagues blocked his way. Bannerman, the collector of Goomsur, appeared to have thwarted him, while the Madras government temporised, and gave Macpherson no efficient support. A Hindu, who had been appointed Zamindar's agent for Khond affairs, was secretly encouraging the Meriah sacrifices, and thus enriching himself with bribes. He obtained the support of Macpherson's superiors, and when in November 1845, Macpherson having been appointed 'governor-general's agent for the suppression of Meriah sacrifice and female infanticide in the hill tracts of Orissa,' proceeded to extend his measures to Boad, a district north of Goomsur, the Hindu's sons raised a rebellion and attacked the camp of the agent. Macpherson was thus compelled to resort to coercive measures; but Bannerman withheld the assistance of troops. The Madras government, too, sent to the disturbed districts a brigadier-general, with the power of superseding Macpherson— a power of which he instantly availed himself; and not content with that, he not only ordered Macpherson and his assistants, and everybody connected with his agency, to withdraw from the country, but summarily dismissed the native officers from the public service. Colonel Campbell, the old rival and opponent of Macpherson, was then appointed agent in his place, and charges were sent in against him, which, after an inquiry lasting a year and a half, were declared by the commissioner, Mr. (afterwards Sir) John Peter Grant, appointed to investigate them, to be unfounded. Meanwhile, the measures adopted by Macpherson for the suppression of the insurrection had already borne fruit; and the brigadier-general had little difficulty in crushing the enemy. Lord Dalhousie, who was now governor-general, declared that nothing could compensate Macpherson for the treatment he had undergone.

In August 1853, Macpherson returned to India from sick-leave to Europe. He was appointed in succession as agent at Benares and at Bhopal, but in July 1854, being then brevet-major, he was transferred to the more important post of Gwalior, the capital of Sindhia, the most powerful native ruler in Central India. The agent, Sir Robert North Hamilton, supported Macpherson's policy in everything. Sindhia's minister, Dinkar Rao, was a statesman of the first order; and Macpherson took care that his administrative genius should have free play. He abolished the transit duties; laid out large sums on the roads and public works; drew up a capital code of law and civil procedure, and raised the revenue from a deficit to a surplus.

Macpherson's support of Dinkar was repaid with interest. When the Sepoy mutinies broke out in 1857, it was Dinkar, influenced by Macpherson, who kept the Gwalior contingent and Sindhia's own army from joining the rebels in Delhi. Macpherson lived to see the mutiny suppressed; but the strain upon his health had teen too great. In April 1860, he was seized with illness, and died, on his way to Calcutta, on 15 April. After his death he was gazetted a Companion of the Order of Bath.
