= Bezmialem Vakıf University =

Private university in İstanbul, Turkey

- Bezmiâlem Vakıf Üniversitesi
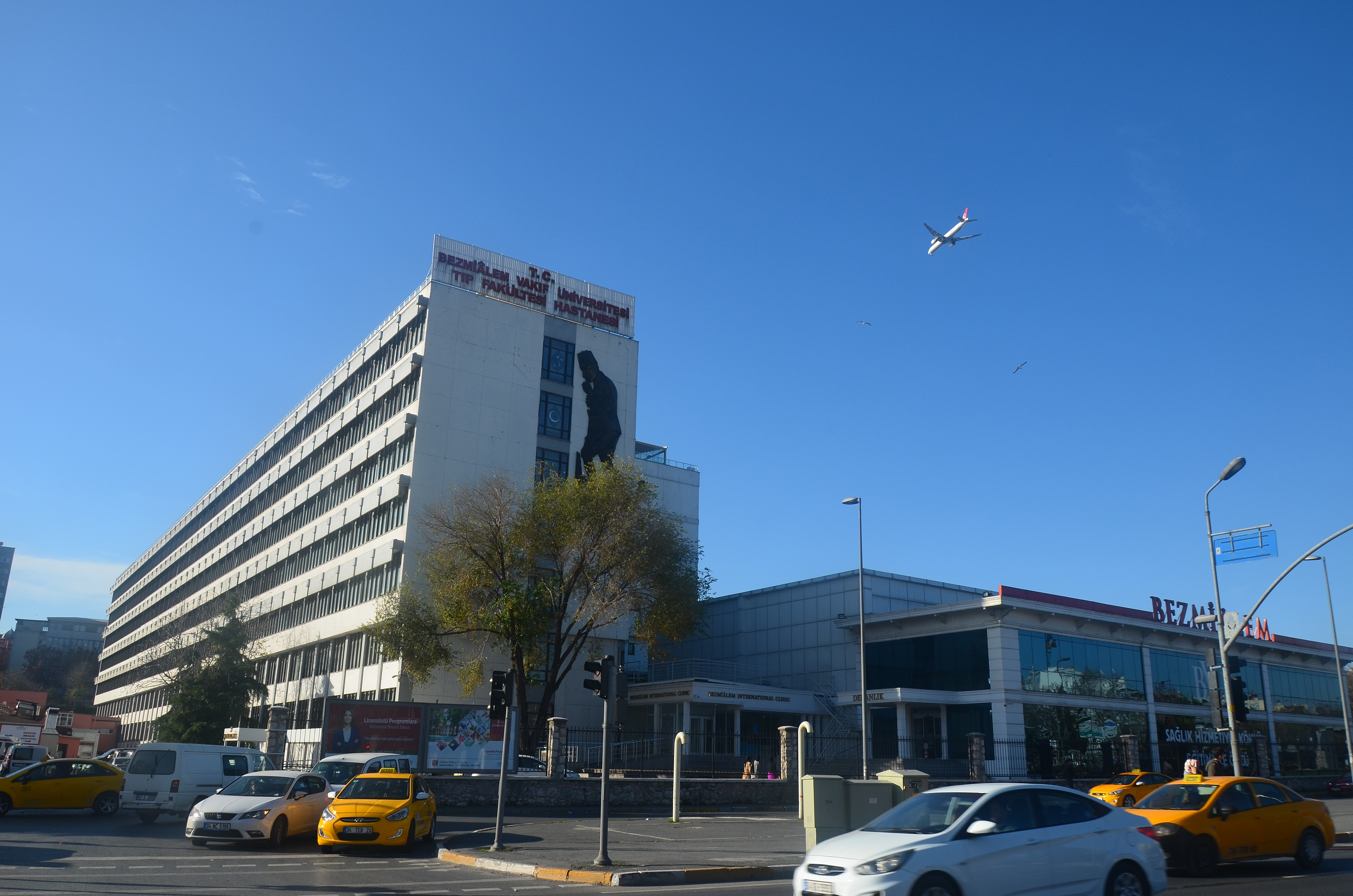
- Bezmialem Vakıf University, School of Medicine Hospital
- Type: Private
- Established: 1845 (as hospital); 2010 (as university)
- Rector: Prof. Dr. Adem Akçakaya
- Location: Istanbul, Turkey; 41°01′06″N 28°56′10″E
- Language: 70% Turkish, 30% English
- Website: bezmialem.edu.tr/en

Bezmialem Vakıf University, originating from the roots of Gureba-i Müslimin, the first modern hospital of the Ottoman Empire that was founded in 1845 by Bezmiâlem Mother Sultana, was transformed into a university in 2010.

Bezmialem is one of the first thematic research universities in Health and Life Sciences in Turkey and also a non-profit foundation university which aims to make progress in education, research and health care. It provides education to about 3,500 students and clinical services to 8,000 patients daily with its two main hospitals and three outpatient clinics on both continents of Istanbul.

The university aspires to keep alive a heritage that is over 175-years old. It aims to be a reference institution on a worldwide level with its four faculties: Medicine, Dentistry and Pharmacy as well as six departments under the Faculty of Health Sciences: Physiotherapy & Rehabilitation, Nursing, Audiology, Health Management, Occupational Therapy and Nutrition & Dietetics. Bezmialem has three Graduate Schools: Institute of Health Sciences, Life Sciences and Biotechnology, and Gastroenterology and also a Vocational School of Health Care Services, with its 14 two-year programs. Bezmialem Vakif University has four main campuses; a Phytotherapy Center, Complementary Medicine Research Center and two institutes located at the very centre of Istanbul's two continents.

Bezmialem Vakif University cooperates with reputable universities in the field and provides training and education on an international level. The university has more than 100 collaborations from all over the world, including Johns Hopkins University, USA, which is among the leading universities in the field of health and education. Collaboration with Johns Hopkins University is mainly to improve the curriculum of the Faculty of Medicine with the inclusion of scholarly concentration modules and training of Bezmialem's students in their last year as clerkships in Baltimore, Maryland, USA.

A number of its programs have already been accredited nationally or internationally. For the last three years, the Faculties of Medicine, Dentistry, Pharmacy, Health Sciences and Vocational School of Health Care Services have been ranked among the top universities in Turkey based on YÖK’s (The Council of Higher Education) placement (YKS) results.

Bezmialem Vakıf University acts as a science university that serves the reverse brain drain with the Institutes of Health Sciences, Gastroenterology, Biotechnology and Life Sciences. Through their graduate programs, the institutes provide important contributions to the training of academicians and to developing international projects.

== Bezmialem Vakif University Hosts ==
- Turkey's Council of Higher Education approved first Phytotherapy Center, which provides plant based treatments in the light of science;
- The Traditional and Complementary Medicine Center which implements ancient treatment methods with modern techniques;
- Experimental Practice and Research Centerand;
- Continuous Education and Practice Center.

Bezmialem has been listed in The University Ranking by Academic Performance (URAP) rankings right after they had their first graduates in 2017. Since then the university ranked first as a university established after the 2000s in Turkey, fourth as a Turkish Foundation University, seventh among Turkish Universities with medical faculties as well as 16th among 148 Turkish Universities.

Bezmialem Vakif University has also been included in the Times Higher Education Impact Rankings 2020

== Academic units ==
Faculties

- School of Medicine
- School of Dentistry
- School of Pharmacy
- School of Health Sciences

Vocational School

- Vocational School for Health Services

Institutes

- Institute of Health Sciences
- Institute of Forensic Science
- Institute of Life Sciences and Biotechnology
- Institute of Gastroenterology

Campuses

- Sultangazi İlhan Varank Campus
- Eyüp Campus
