= William McPherson =

William McPherson or Macpherson may refer to:

- William Macpherson (civil servant) (1784–1866), clerk of the Legislative Council of New South Wales
- William Macpherson (British Army officer) (1858–1927), colonel-commandant and author
- William Macpherson (judge) (1926–2021), judge of the High Court of England and Wales and chair of the enquiry into the murder of Stephen Lawrence
- William MacPherson (priest) (1901–1978), Anglican dean of Lichfield
- William Macpherson (cricketer), English cricketer
- William Macpherson (legal writer), Scottish legal writer
- William McPherson (university president) (1864–1951), president of Ohio State University
- William Murray McPherson (1865–1932), Australian philanthropist and politician
- William McPherson Allen (1900–1985), American aircraft businessman
- William McPherson (writer) (1933–2017), 1977 winner of the Pulitzer Prize for Criticism
- William David McPherson (1863–1929), Ontario barrister and political figure

== See also ==
- Bill McPherson (disambiguation)
