= Audiology and hearing health professionals in developed and developing countries =

Audiology and hearing health professionals in developed and developing countries describes a field of study and practice that examines the global disparities in the availability, accessibility, and standards of audiological care and hearing health. The central professional in this field is the audiologist, a practitioner uniquely qualified through academic and clinical training to provide services related to the prevention, identification, assessment, diagnosis, and treatment of hearing loss and vestibular disorders, as defined by the American Academy of Audiology. The core theme of the field is the critical analysis of how the role, density, and recognition of this profession differ drastically between well-resourced health systems in developed nations and the challenges faced in developing countries, which include a critical shortage of trained audiologists, a lack of educational programs, and inequitable access to services.

According to the World Health Organization (WHO), approximately 250 million people worldwide have a disabling hearing impairment (i.e., moderate or worse hearing loss in the better ear). Of these 250 million people, two-thirds live in developing countries. Therefore, it is not surprising that adult-onset hearing loss ranks 15th amongst the leading causes of the Global Burden of Disease (GBD).

== Prevention ==
According to the World Health Organization, "half of all cases of hearing loss can be prevented through primary prevention. Some simple strategies for prevention include:

- immunizing children against childhood diseases, including measles, meningitis, rubella and mumps;
- immunizing adolescent girls and women of reproductive age against rubella before pregnancy;
- screening for and treating syphilis and other infections in pregnant women;
- improving antenatal and perinatal care, including promotion of safe childbirth;
- avoiding the use of ototoxic drugs, unless prescribed and monitored by a qualified physician;
- referring babies with high risk factors (such as those with a family history of deafness, those born with low birth weight, birth asphyxia, jaundice or meningitis) for early assessment of hearing, prompt diagnosis and appropriate management, as required; and
- reducing exposure (both occupational and recreational) to loud noises by creating awareness, using personal protective devices, and developing and implementing suitable legislation.

Hearing loss due to otitis media can be prevented by healthy ear and hearing care practices. It can be suitably dealt with through early detection, followed by appropriate medical or surgical interventions."

== Screening for hearing loss ==
Due to the lack of readably available hearing screenings in developing countries, hearing loss is often left undetected in all ages. Reasons for the lack of hearing screenings is in part due to limited personnel and financial resources, according to McPherson and Olusanya (2008). Hearing screenings are considered a high priority component of a hearing healthcare program in large due to the fact that early detection of hearing loss in infants can allow for prompt assessment, detection, and intervention of congenital and early onset hearing loss. Furthermore, research has shown the importance of early intervention during the critical period of speech and language development (Yoshinaga-Itano et al., 1998). Lastly, hearing screenings may be able to detect transient hearing losses that may dissipate with appropriate medical intervention.

Currently, actions have been taken in developing countries to prevent hearing loss. These actions include: promotion of immunization against known causes of hearing loss (e.g., measles, mumps, and rubella); improved care of mothers before and during child delivery; and education on the use or misuse of ototoxic drugs. Unfortunately, the healthcare systems in the majority of developing countries are unable to uphold these standards of care.

=== Definition and principles ===
According to the World Health Organization (1971), screening is a "medical investigation that does not arise from a patient’s request for advice for specific complains. The term covers all types of examination and does not refer to their speed or accuracy." Similarly Harford et al. (1978) states, "screening is a process by which individuals are identified who may have disease or disorders that are otherwise undetected" and which many have "findings of asymptomatic cases" (Haggard & Hughes, 1991). When considering an appropriate screening program for a developing, or developed, country, Wilson and Jungner (1968) recommend the following ten basic principles that screening program should observe:

1. "The condition to be screened for should be an important health problem
2. There should be an accepted treatment for cases identified
3. Facilities for diagnosis and treatment should be available
4. There should be a recognizable latent (early, asymptomatic) stage in the condition
5. There should be a suitable test to employ in screening
6. The test should be acceptable to the population
7. The natural history of the condition should be understood
8. There should be an agreed policy on whom to treat as patients
9. The cost of case-finding (including diagnosis and treatment of those diagnosed) should be non-wastefully balanced in relation to expenditure on medical care as a whole
10. Case-finding should be an ongoing process and not a ‘one-off’ project."

=== Tools ===
In developing countries, the predominant method of detecting children with hearing loss is through parental suspicion due to the child’s inappropriate response, or lack of response, to sound and occurs at a mean age of 22 months (Gopal et al., 2001; Mukari et al, 1999; Olusanya et al., 2005). Early detection of hearing loss requires reliable, valid, easy to apply, and safe hearing screening battery in order to be used in developing countries. A hearing screening is considered valid, according to McPherson and Olusanya (2008), "if it detects the majority of subjects with the target disorder (high sensitivity) and excludes most subjects without the disorder (high specificity) and if a positive test indicates the presence of the disorder (high positive predictive value)." Two objective screening tests available for use in infants are otoacoustic emissions (OAEs) and auditory brainstem response (ABR).

An OAE is an electrophysiologic measure of the integrity of the outer hair cells in the cochlea. Two types of OAEs are transient evoked otoacoustic emissions (TEOAEs) and distortion product otoacoustic emissions (DPOAEs). This test is relatively quick, non-invasive, and does not require the sleep or sedation. The OAE screener results in either a pass or fail result, making it easy to read without requiring the screener to have audiological expertise. Furthermore, OAEs have a high sensitivity (>90%) and specificity (>96%) based on a two-stage screening (Davis et al., 1997; JCIH, 2000). Disadvantages of OAEs include its sensitivity to conductive hearing loss, which may occur within the first few days of life due to a vernix plug in an infant's ear canal, does not detect auditory neuropathy, and DPOAEs may miss mild hearing loss.

ABR is an electrophysiologic measure of the function of cranial nerve eight and the auditory pathway in the brainstem. Three electrodes are placed on the scalp in order to record electrical responses from auditory stimuli. Recordings may be measured when the baby is sleeping, sedated, or in a quiet state. ABR recordings are correlated with the degree of hearing loss, for click ABR this range is from 1k to 4k Hz within 10 to 15 dB HL. The screening version of ABR, or automated ABR (AABR), is designed to produce a simple pass or fail result. AABR has high sensitivity (>90%), high specificity (>96%) and low positive predictive value (19%) (Vohr et al., 2001; Watkin, 2001). One advantage of AABR is that it is able to identify auditory neuropathy; however, the disadvantage is that AABR may miss mild sensorineural or exclusively low frequency hearing loss. Therefore, it is recommended that hearing screening programs utilize a two-stage screening protocol that is made up of TEOAEs and AABR. Combined, these two tests have the most favorable combination of specificity, sensitivity, acceptability and high coverage in hospitals with a wide range of birth rates (Kennedy et al., 2000; Vohr et al., 2001). McPherson and Olusanya (2008) write, "evidence from ongoing infant hearing screening programs has shown that these tests are acceptable to parents because they are not invasive, painless and quick to administer. They are currently employed in developed countries and in a growing number of developing countries." Lastly, it is recommended that the two-stage screening protocol be performed on newborns prior to hospital discharge in order to decrease the number of infants lost to follow-up care.

=== Hospital-based hearing screening ===
Screening newborns in the hospital prior to discharge eliminates the need to ask parents to return specifically for their child to have a hearing test and allows healthcare professionals to satisfy an ethical obligation to ensure infants have been assessed for hidden abnormality prior to discharge. Parents may be less likely to return to the hospital for an invisible and non-life-threatening disorder in their apparently normal newborn babies.

In order to implement the two-stage screening protocol (i.e., TEOAEs and AABR), it is recommended the screening be entrusted to a dedicated team since adding this responsibility onto the nurses workload could result in few to none hearing screenings being performed since nurses may view this task as being less important compared to other routine clinical duties (McPherson & Olusanya, 2008). Lastly, the two-stage screener should begin with TEOAEs followed by AABR for those referred from the first stage (i.e., TEOAEs). Screening should occur has close to discharge as possible in order to minimize referral rates from vernix plugs.

Challenges faced in hospital-based screenings may include: excessive ambient noise causing higher referral rates; a long queue of babies may results on parents growing impatient and thus leaving prior to having their baby screened; and may fail to reach a significant number of newborns that are born outside of hospitals, which are common in developing countries (UNICEF, 2005).

=== Clinic-based hearing screening ===
In developing countries, the majority of babies are born outside of hospitals (WHO, 2004) which causes a dilemma when developing hearing screening based in hospital settings. Fortunately, "routine childhood immunization is perhaps the most well-established public health program globally, due to substantial technical/financial support it receives yearly from UNICEF, WHO and several donor agencies/partners" (McPherson & Olusanya, 2008). Mothers with newborns, regardless of the birthing location, take their babies to immunization clinics at designated community health centers. Immunization clinics have been used as platforms for delivering new child health intervention packages in developing countries (WHO, 2002) due their popularity derived from its known preventive value of preventing childhood deaths from killer disease and because it is offered free to parents. Therefore, community-based hearing screenings may be performed in immunization clinics in hopes of reaching the newborn babies missed in hospital-based screenings. Furthermore, Lin et al. (2004), Kapil (2002), and Bantock and Croxson (1998) speculate that hearing screenings may even be performed at infant welfare clinics and other child health programs.

=== Targeted or universal newborn hearing screening ===
When considering universal newborn hearing screenings, an important ethical requirement is the delivery of equitable access to all babies. However, due to lack of resources in some settings and communities, a more targeted hearing screening approach may serve as a good take-off point for universal newborn hearing screenings. A targeted screening approach limits the screenings to babies who exhibit some risk factors for hearing loss. Risk factors for hearing loss are provided below in the table titled, "Risk Factors For Hearing Loss in Newborns (JCIH, 2000)." Targeted screening has been shown to identify approximately 50% of babies with moderate to profound hearing loss (Vohr et al., 2000; Watkin et al., 1991). Unfortunately, this low number is due to the limitations of high risk factors either being difficult to detect at birth or during early childhood and lack of education of the high risk factors for hearing loss, especially in developing countries (Derekoy, 2000; Gray, 1989; Minja, 1998). As mentioned previously, targeted screenings may be useful in establishing universal newborn hearing screenings in specific communities and educate communities on the predominant risk factors of hearing loss while establishing a more effective and culturally-appropriate universal hearing screening program.

Risk factors for hearing loss in newborns, according to the JCIH, 2000, including:

- Family history of sensorineural hearing loss.
- In-utero infections such as rubella, cytomegalovirus, syphilis, toxoplasmosis and herpes.
- Craniofacial anomalies.
- Birth weight less than 1,500g (3.3 lbs).
- Hyperbilirubinemia at levels quiring exchange transfusion.
- Bacterial meningitis.
- Ototoxic medications.
- Mechanical ventilation lasting 5 days or more.
- Stigmata or other findings associated with a syndrome known to include a sensorineural and/or conductive hearing loss.
- Birth asphyxia with Apgar scores less than or equal to 5 at 1 minute or less than or equal to 6 at 5 minutes.

=== School-based hearing screening ===
In order to diagnose missed, progressive, or late-onset hearing loss, school-based hearing screenings are recommended in order to identify children with hearing loss. School-based screenings have long been reported in the majority of developed countries and a few in developing countries. Examples of programs in developing countries include Columbia, Costa Rica, Cuba, Nicaragua, Panama, Kenya, Ghana, and Jamaica (Madriz, 2001; Macharia, 2003; Amedofu et al., 2003; Lyn et al., 1998). According to McPherson and Olusanya (2008), "school screening audiometry has concentrated on the detection of possible disorders in primary (elementary) school children. This has been due to:

- An underlying rationale for screening being that there is an advantage in the earliest possible treatment of the condition detected (Paradise & Smith, 1979);
- The common finding that there are a number of children with previously undetected hearing losses entering the primary school system (Roeser & Clark, 2004). This may be particularly so in developing countries in the absence of neonatal or infant screening programs (McPherson & Holborow, 1988);
- The generally higher prevalence of otitis media with effusion related hearing loss in the earlier school grades. However, programs for secondary (high) school children have also been implemented in many areas (Hodges, 1983)."

==== Ethical considerations ====
There are limitations of both equipment and potential screening staff. For example, the screening staff may not have the skills in otoscopy, or ear examination, to identify ear pathology as such, other than through gross visual examination for disorders such as pinna abnormalities, discharge, or impacted wax (McPherson & Olusanya, 2008). Gell et al., (1992) advises against the use of tympanometry in screening for developing countries where the prevalence of otitis media is high since "(a) ear discharge can be better noted through visual inspection of the ear, and (b) identification of moderate to severe hearing loss is a priority" (McPherson & Olusanya, 2008).

==== School screening audiometry techniques and protocols ====
Considerations when determining an effective school-based screening protocol in developing countries includes hearing loss criteria, screening tools, and an appropriate referral pathway. In regards to the pass/fail criteria for hearing screenings, the American Speech-Language-Hearing Association (ASHA) guidelines use a >20 dB HL cut-off intensity (Roush, 1990) though there is a growing tendency for audiologists in developed countries to use a >15 dB HL criteria. The World Health Organization (WHO) criterion for "priority for hearing aids" in children is an average hearing loss in the 31 to 80 dB HL range in the better ear (WHO, 2004). However, if there is a local capacity to provide appropriate hearing health care, according to McPherson and Olusanya (2008), then this does not preclude screening that also targets milder degrees of hearing loss. Research has shown that even minimal intervention such as preferential seating in the classroom may improve educational outcomes for children with slight and mild hearing loss and unilateral hearing loss (McPherson & Holborow, 1985; Olusanya et al., 2004). The three recommended tests in school-based-screenings for developing countries are otoscopy, pure-tone audiometry screening, and otoacoustic emissions (OAEs). Otoscopy is useful in the examination of the external ear, ear canal, and tympanic membrane. Otoscopic examination is useful in ruling out impacted cerumen. According to Rao et al. (2002), Lyn et al. (1998), and Swart et al. (1995), impacted cerumen is one of the most common ear diseases and causes of hearing loss, with prevalence rate between 7.4% and 63%. Additionally, otoscopy does not require a great deal of expertise beyond basic training and is useful to refer a child when the tympanic membrane cannot be visualized due to occlusion of the external auditory meatus by cerumen. Pure-tone audiometry screening, in which there is typically no attempt to find threshold, has been found to accurately assess hearing status in children six years and older, when trained health workers in the community of rural Bangladeshi village used a simple condition play response procedure (Berg et al., 2006). Recommended test frequencies are 1000, 2000, and 4000 Hz, at 20 dB HL according to the ASHA (1997) guidelines for screening audiometry. However, 500 Hz has been found to identify the auditory impact of otitis media with effusion in children and should be included at 25 dB HL when permitted by ambient noise levels (WHO, 1997). In regards to equipment, noise-excluding earphones are advisable in order to limit external noise factors. If possible, though costly, an effective way to reduce background noise is through the use of a mobile hearing screening facility. Examples of such a facility include the use of a 4x4 vehicles in the HARK Project of South Africa (Ogilvy & Michelson, 2003). These facilities incorporate a sound-treated environment for hearing screening. Lastly, in order to reduce operator errors, Roeser and Clark (2004) recommend a minimum training program of no less than five days while WHO recommends an initial three-week training program (WHO, 2004) for ‘primary ear health workers.’ Otoacoustic emissions (OAEs) can be in both newborns and child based hearing screenings. OAEs are an objective tool that can be used to measure the integrity of the outer hair cells in the cochlear; however, test results below 2000 Hz can be adversely affected by high levels of ambient noise in the school environment (Nozza, 2001). OAEs can be used in populations where responses to pure-tone audiometry are either unable to be obtained or results are unreliable. OAEs may be particularly useful in the screening of preschool age children.

=== Availability and management of amplification ===
Due to the lack of available research and data on amplification availability and management in developing countries, the information below is from case studies and low-income communities in developed countries. According to the World Health Organization (WHO, 2013), approximately 360 million people worldwide have a hearing loss greater than 40 dB HL. Of these 360 million, less than 10% either own or have access to proper hearing aids. The vast majority of this population lives in low- and middle- income countries, with the majority residing in South Asia, the Asian Pacific, and sub-Saharan Africa. More developed cities, such as Hong Kong, offer over-the-counter hearing aids sold at electrical and department stores around the city. The styles of hearing aids currently available over-the-counter include: in the canal (ITC), behind the ear (BTE), and body worn (BW) hearing aids. An average over-the-counter hearing aid typically costs approximately $25US for BTE and BW and $250US for ITC in comparison to $250US to $1,500US for the same hearing aids prescribed by an audiologist. Therefore, over-the-counter hearing aids offer a relatively more affordable option to developing countries where the majority of citizens do not have the money to seek hearing aids from within the professional setting. Unfortunately, Cheng and McPherson (2000) write, many over-the-counter hearing aids are set for very specific hearing losses, especially for those that require more low frequency gain than high frequency gain. Alternatively, hearing aids donated in developed countries can be brought and fit by humanitarian organizations in developing countries. Currently, finding appropriate amplification that is fit to the individual user's hearing loss is an area in great need of attention. Smith (2003) writes that 50% of hearing loss is avoidable (e.g., noise exposure, medical intervention, etc.), thus leaving 50% unavoidable (e.g., genetic or hereditary hearing loss) and requiring amplification.

== Low and middle income countries ==
For a list of countries by income see

== See also ==
- Audiology
- Global Audiology
- Hearing
- Hearing Aid
- Hearing impairment
- International Society of Audiology
- Listening
- Noise induced hearing loss
- Otolaryngology
- Otology
