= Juan de Miralles =

Spanish diplomat (1713–1780)

- Born: July 23, 1713; Petrer, Valencian Community, Spain
- Died: April 28, 1780 (aged 66); Morristown, New Jersey
- Occupations: Arms dealer and messenger to the American Continental Congress

Juan de Miralles y Tizner (July 23, 1713, in Petrer, Province of Alicante, Spain – April 28, 1780 in Morristown, New Jersey) was a Spanish arms dealer who became friends with George Washington during the American Revolutionary War. He supported the American cause financially, and served as a liaison between the colonists and the Spanish Crown.

== Biography ==
Juan de Miralles was born in Petrer, Alicante, Spain, on July 23, 1713. His Mother was French émigreé; his father, Juan de Miralles -a classical surname of Alicante's province- (or Mirailles) y Tizner, was born in the city of Monein in the French province of Béarn, and served as a captain of infantry in the Royal Spanish Army under Philip V of Spain. His mother, Gracia Trailhon, was a native of the Kingdom of Navarre on the French side of the Pyrenees. Consequently, he learned both French and Spanish as a child. Although there is little information about Miralles's early life, it is known that he was in Spain at age 19, and was employed in Cádiz by the Spanish firm Aguirre, Aristegui and Company, which traded with the British and Spanish colonies in the Americas, and held the monopoly on the slave trade of Cuba. It is likely that Miralles crossed the Atlantic Ocean on company business during this time, and learned the English language in the course of his duties. Miralles emigrated to Cuba still at a young age, and soon established himself as a merchant in Havana, then the center of Spanish maritime commerce in the Americas, and also of the intercolonial smuggling of contraband. Being by this time fluent in English, Miralles was one of the more active traders out of Havana doing business with the Thirteen Colonies.

Given the possible threat represented by the British Royal Navy to the maritime commerce of the Spanish colonies, Spain took an officially neutral position in the American War of Independence. However, having lost Florida under the terms of the Treaty of Paris (1763) which ended the Seven Years' War, the American Revolution provided a potential opportunity to regain lost territory, or at least a measure of revenge. Miralles was secretly ordered by Minister of the Indies José de Gálvez to observe and report on the military activities of the United States and on the Continental Congress in Philadelphia, capital of the United States at the time. His dispatches were forwarded to de Gálvez by Diego José Navarro García de Valladares, newly appointed captain-general of Cuba. Miralles and his secretary arrived in Charleston, South Carolina in December 1777, to start their overland journey to Philadelphia, where they arrived in early 1778. Miralles met Washington at a Christmas party and presented a letter of introduction from Navarro. Privateer John Macpherson leased his Mount Pleasant mansion to Miralles. Also while in Philadelphia, Miralles became affiliated with the prominent shipping-banking firm of Willing, Morris & Co.

During the Seven Years' War, France had ceded Spain its Louisiana territory west of the Mississippi under the Treaty of Fontainebleau (1762). In 1779, the two countries signed the Treaty of Aranjuez by which Charles III of Spain agreed to assist his first cousin, Louis XVI in his conflict with the British. In September 1779, the Governor of Spanish Louisiana, Bernardo de Gálvez launched a pre-emptive strike against the British and seized Fort Bute on the Bayou Manchac, thus opening a second front. In February 1780 Miralles notified Washington that the Spanish had taken Baton Rouge and Natchez. Washington assured Miralles that he would notify him of any British movements that might be "of interest to your court".

Miralles fell ill with a fever while on a visit to Washington's camp in Morristown, New Jersey, where he died on April 28, 1780. He was initially buried in the Presbyterian cemetery in Morristown. The French Minister Plenipotentiary, Anne-César, Chevalier de la Luzerne arranged for a requiem Mass to be celebrated for Miralles at St. Mary's Church in Philadelphia on 8 May 1780. After the war, the remains were moved, probably to Cuba, where his wife lived.

== Family ==
Juan de Miralles married María Josefa de la Puente, the sister of Eligio de la Puente, in 1744. The de la Puente family was influential in Cuban political affairs. The couple had eight children, a son and seven daughters. Miralles was the uncle of merchant and politician Pedro Casanave, who served a term as mayor of Georgetown and presided over the ceremonial laying of the cornerstone of the President's House, later to be known as the White House, on October 13, 1792.

== See also ==
- Spain and the American Revolutionary War
