= William Macpherson (legal writer) =

Scottish legal writer

- Born: 19 July 1812
- Died: April 20, 1893 (aged 80); London, England
- Occupation: Legal writer

William Macpherson (19 July 1812 – 20 April 1893) was a Scottish legal writer.

== Biography ==
Macpherson was born on 19 July 1812. He was the brother of John Macpherson and of Samuel Charters Macpherson. He was educated at Charterhouse and Trinity College, Cambridge, where he graduated B. A. in 1834, and M.A. in 1838. Called to the bar by the Inner Temple in 1837, he published in 1841 a 'Practical Treatise on the Law relating to Infants' (Edinburgh, 8vo), which attracted notice owing to its learning and accuracy. In 1846 he went to India to practice at the Indian bar, and in 1848 was given by Sir Laurence Peel, chief-justice of Bengal, the post of master of equity in the supreme court in Calcutta. His 'Procedure of the Civil Courts of India' (Calcutta, 1850, 8vo) became at once a recognised authority, reaching a fifth edition in 1871, and his 'Outlines of the Law of Contracts as administered in the Courts of British India' was issued in London in 1860. He spent nearly two years (1854–5) in England on leave, and finally left India in March 1859. In October 1860 he was entrusted by John Murray the publisher with the editorship of the 'Quarterly Review.' He held that office till October 1867, contributing three articles to the ' Review,' viz. 'Scottish Character' (July 1861), 'The Stanhope Miscellanies' (January 1863), and 'Law Reform' (October 1864). In December 1861 he became secretary of the Indian Law. Commission, which was appointed to prepare a body of substantive law for India, and he withdrew from literary work in 1867 in order to devote himself solely to that work. The Indian Succession Act of 1865 illustrates the value of the commission's labours, but owing to the Indian government's desire to exercise more direct control over the undertaking, the commission was dissolved in December 1870. Macpherson thereupon returned to the bar, and practiced chiefly before the privy council. His useful 'Practice of the Privy Council Judicial Committee,' first published in 1860, reached a second edition in 1873. In 1874 he began reporting the Indian appeals before the privy council for the Council of Law Reporting. In June 1874 he became legal adviser to the India office, and in September 1879 exchanged that post for that of secretary in the judicial department. He retired from the India office on 20 February 1882. 'Memorials' by him of his brother, Samuel Charters Macpherson, appeared in 1865. He died in London on 20 April 1893. He married, on 9 January 1851, Diana Macleod Johnston, who died in 1880, and left issue.
