= David Macpherson =

David Macpherson may refer to:

- David Macpherson (engineer) (1854–1927), Canadian-born American railroad engineer
- David Macpherson (historian) (1746–1816), Scottish antiquarian
- David Macpherson (tennis) (born 1967), Australian former professional tennis player
- David Lewis Macpherson (1818–1896), Canadian businessman and political figure
- David Macpherson, 2nd Baron Strathcarron (1924–2006), British peer and motorcyclist
- David Murdoch MacPherson (1847–1915), Canadian dairyman, inventor, manufacturer and political figure

== See also ==
- David McPherson (disambiguation)
