= Goomsur =

Goomsur (also known as Gumsur and Ghumsar) was an area consisting of roughly 3496 square kilometres of mountains and densely forested land near Ganjam in what was known as Orissa (now Odisha), in eastern India. It was the site of several uprisings from 1763 to 1866. with the most significant occurring in 1835-36 when the East India Company armies of the Madras Native Infantry led a military action against the native tribes (the Khond) and local rulers, ultimately annexing the state for the British. This action has become known as the "Goomsur Campaign".
