= McPhearson =

McPhearson is a Scottish surname. It is an Anglicised form of the Gaelic Mac a' Phearsain and Mac a Phearsoin, meaning "son of the parson". Notable people with the surname include:

- Gerrick McPhearson, American football player
- Zech McPhearson (born 1998), American football player

== See also ==
- McPherson
