= Robert McPherson =

Robert may refer to:

- Bob McPherson (born 1968), British wheelchair curling player at the 2014 Winter Paralympics
- Robert McPherson (basketball), basketball coach
- Robert McPherson (cricketer) (1864–1904), New Zealand cricketer
- Robert McPherson (footballer) (1850–?), Scottish international football (soccer) player
- Robert B. McPherson (1891–1947), member of the California legislature
