= Olusanya =

- Gender: Male
- Language(s): Yoruba

Origin
- Word/name: Nigeria
- Meaning: The hero paid back for (our) suffering.

Other names
- Nickname(s): Olu

listen

Olusanya is a surname. It means "The hero paid back for (our) suffering". It is a Yoruba name. Notable people with the surname include:

- Bolajoko Olubukunola Olusanya, Nigerian pediatrician and social entrepreneur
- G.O. Olusanya (1936–2012), Nigerian academic, administrator, and diplomat
- Kemi Olusanya (1963–1999), better known as Kemistry, English DJ and record producer
- Toyosi Olusanya (born 1998), English footballer
