= Mount Pleasant (mansion) =

Historic house in Pennsylvania, United States

Coordinates: 39°59′00″N 75°11′59″W

- U.S. National Register of Historic Places
- U.S. National Historic Landmark
- Philadelphia Register of Historic Places
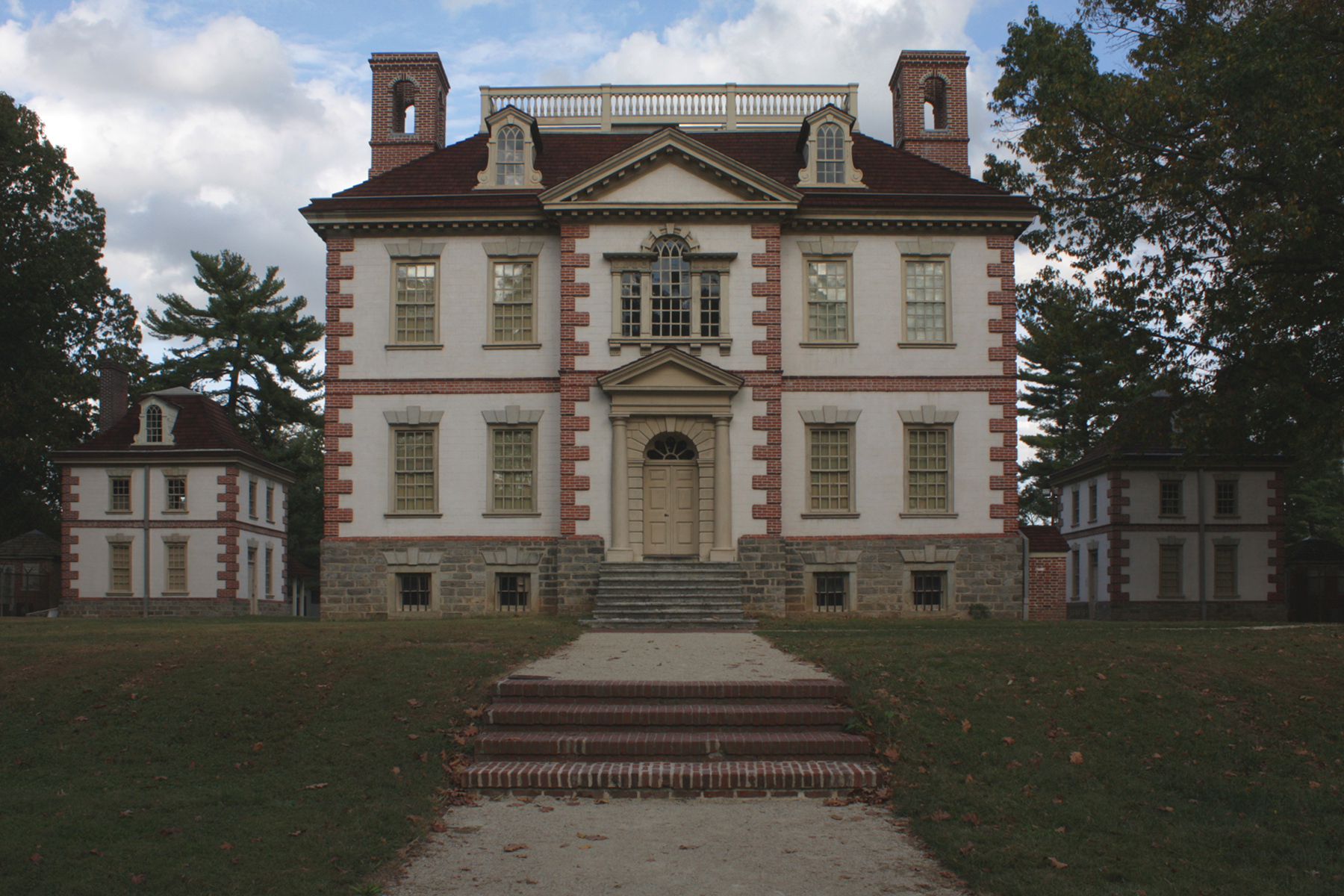
- River facade

- Location within Philadelphia Location within Pennsylvania Location within the United States
- Location: Mount Pleasant Drive, between Kelly Drive and Columbia Avenue; Fairmount Park; Philadelphia, Pennsylvania, United States
- Area: Less than 1-acre (4,000 m^{2})
- Built: c. 1761
- Architectural style: Georgian
- NRHP reference No.: 66000685

Significant dates
- Added to NRHP: October 15, 1966
- Designated NHL: May 30, 1974

Mount Pleasant is a historic mansion in Philadelphia, Pennsylvania, atop cliffs overlooking the Schuylkill River. It was built about 1761–62 in what was then the countryside outside the city by John Macpherson and his wife Margaret. Macpherson was a privateer, or perhaps a pirate, who had had "an arm twice shot off" according to John Adams. He named the house "Clunie" after the ancient seat of his family's clan in Scotland.

The builder-architect was Thomas Nevell (1721—1797), an apprentice of Edmund Woolley, who built Independence Hall. The house is administered by the Philadelphia Museum of Art in Fairmount Park.

It was declared a National Historic Landmark in 1974.

== Architecture and history ==
The Georgian mansion has an entrance topped by a pediment supported by Doric columns. A balustrade crowns the roof which also has prominent dormers and two large chimneys. Two small symmetrical pavilions flank the main house, an office and a summer kitchen. All are adorned with brick quoins.

John Adams visited the mansion in 1775 and called it "the most elegant seat in Pennsylvania." The interiors contain the original paneling with ornamental carving, and still show the "elegance of the lifestyle of colonial elites," as well as souvenirs of Macpherson's life and times and period furniture by craftsmen such as Martin Jugiez. The furniture is from the collections of the Philadelphia Museum of Art.

Mount Pleasant was also home to Benedict Arnold and his wife Peggy Shippen. Arnold purchased the mansion on March 22, 1779, for his new bride, and specifically made the property over to her, although, due to the high price of the estate and Benedict's deteriorating funds, he had to sell it, thus the couple never got a chance to move in.

In 1792, the mansion was purchased by Jonathan Williams, first superintendent of West Point and grandnephew of Benjamin Franklin. He lived there intermittently until his death in 1815, and his children sold the estate to Fairmount Park.

The structure was restored in 1926 by the Philadelphia Museum of Art.

== Gallery ==
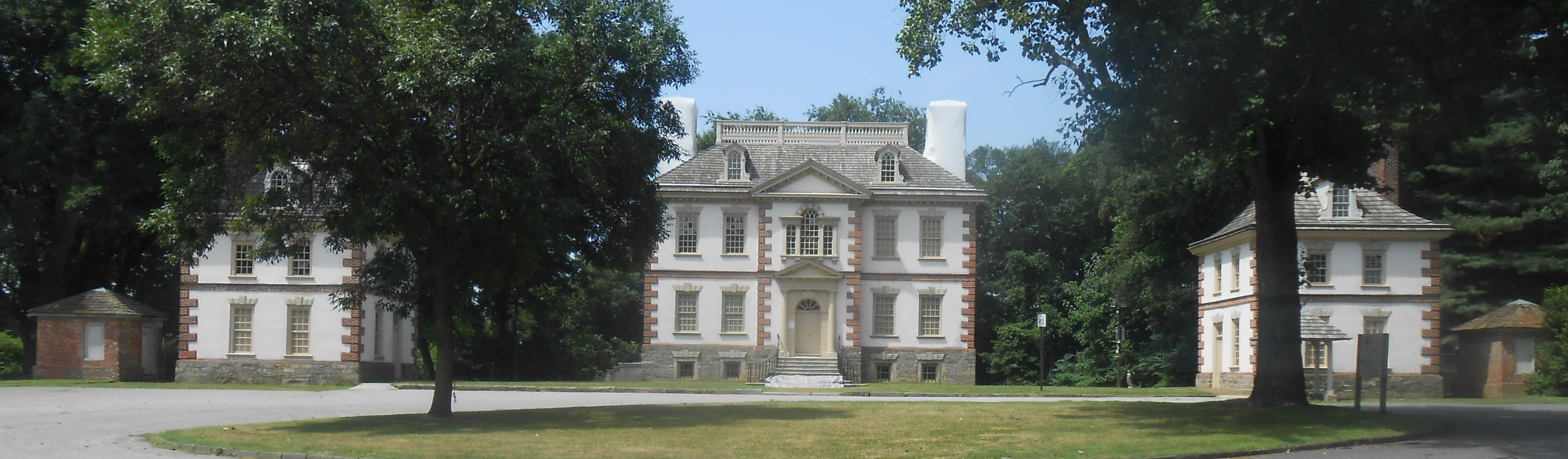
Land façade and end pavilions

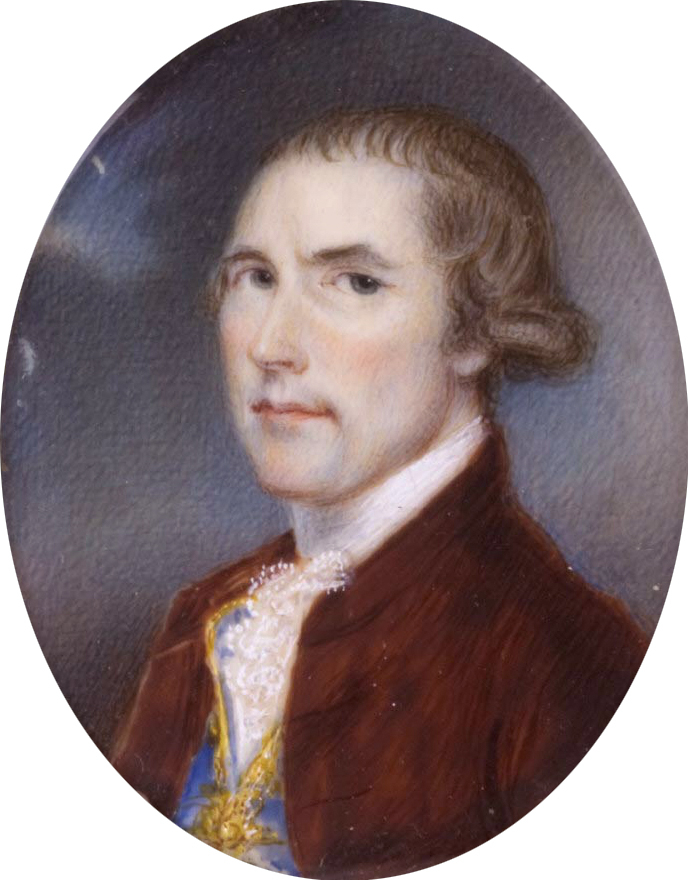
Captain John Macpherson (1726–1792)

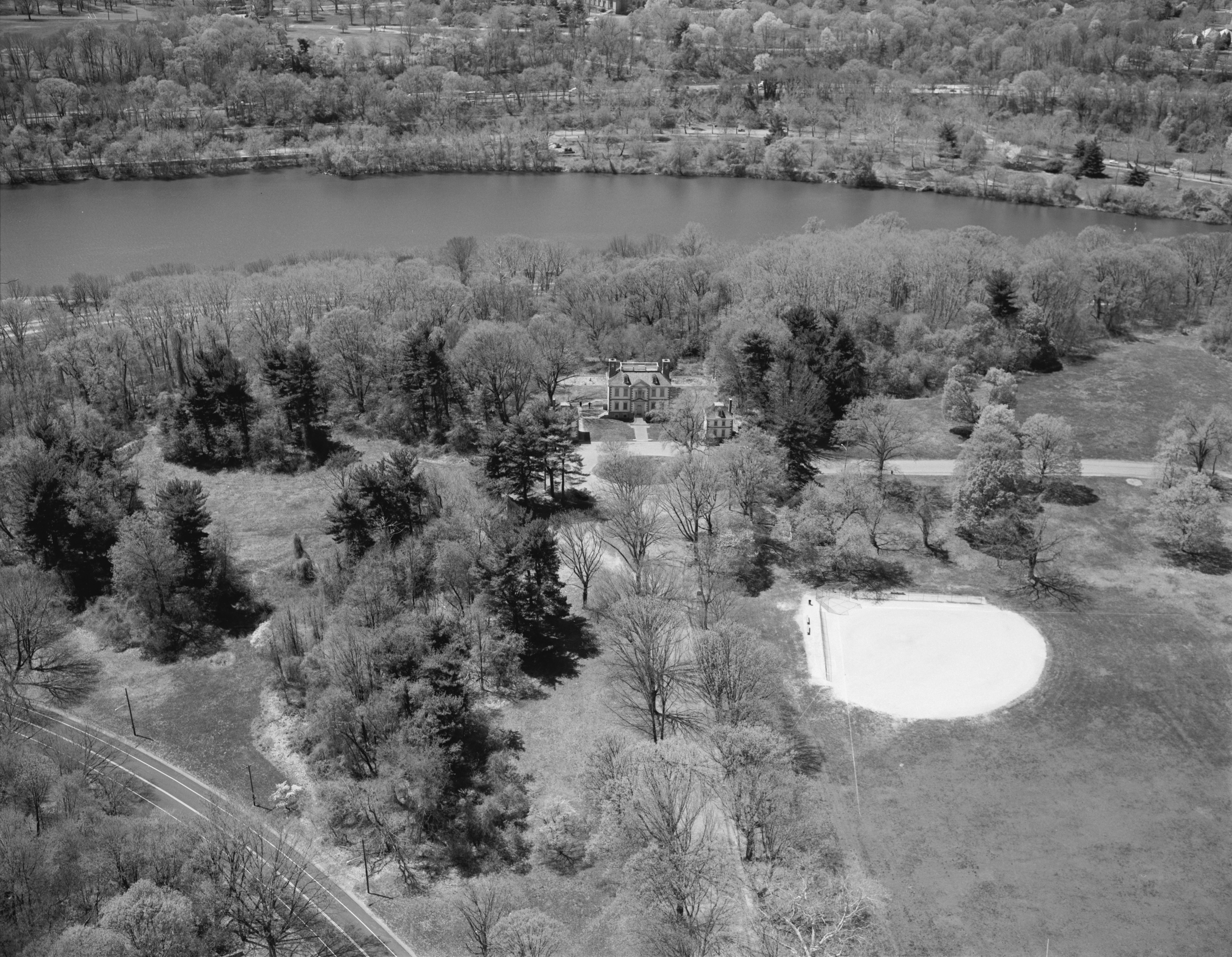
Historic American Buildings Survey, aerial view, looking west, 2003

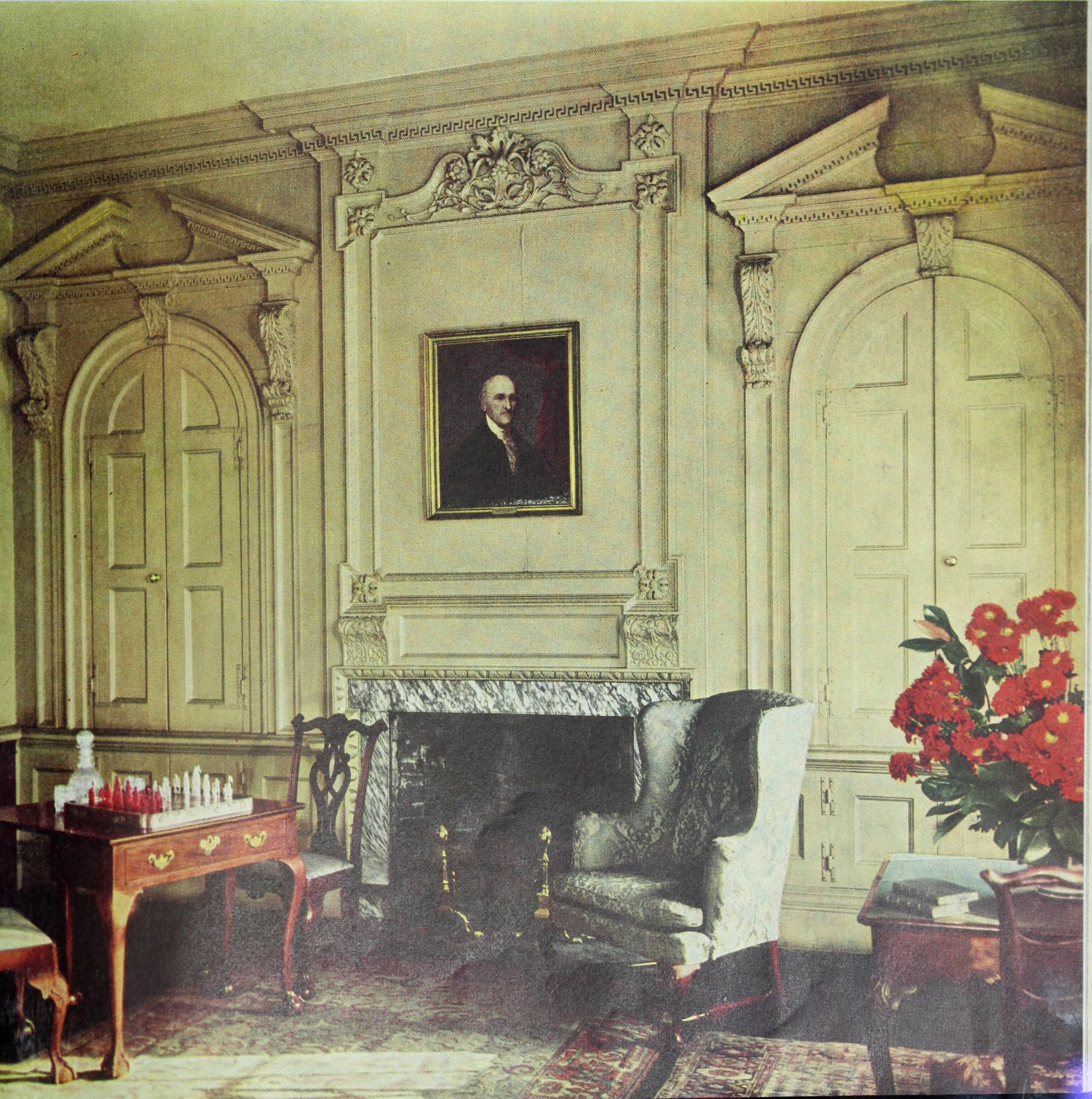
Parlor, 1948

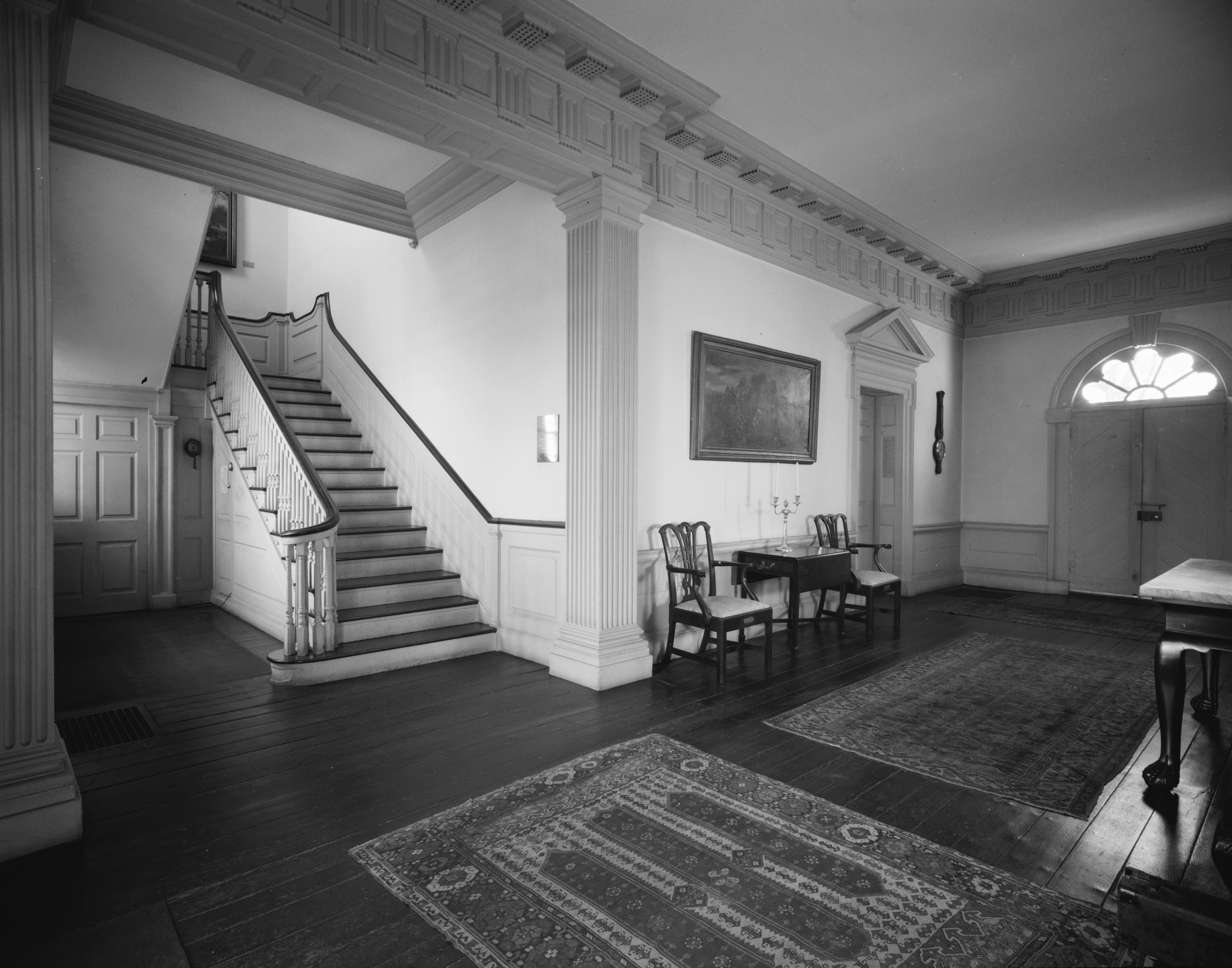
Historic American Buildings Survey, main hall and stairway, 1960

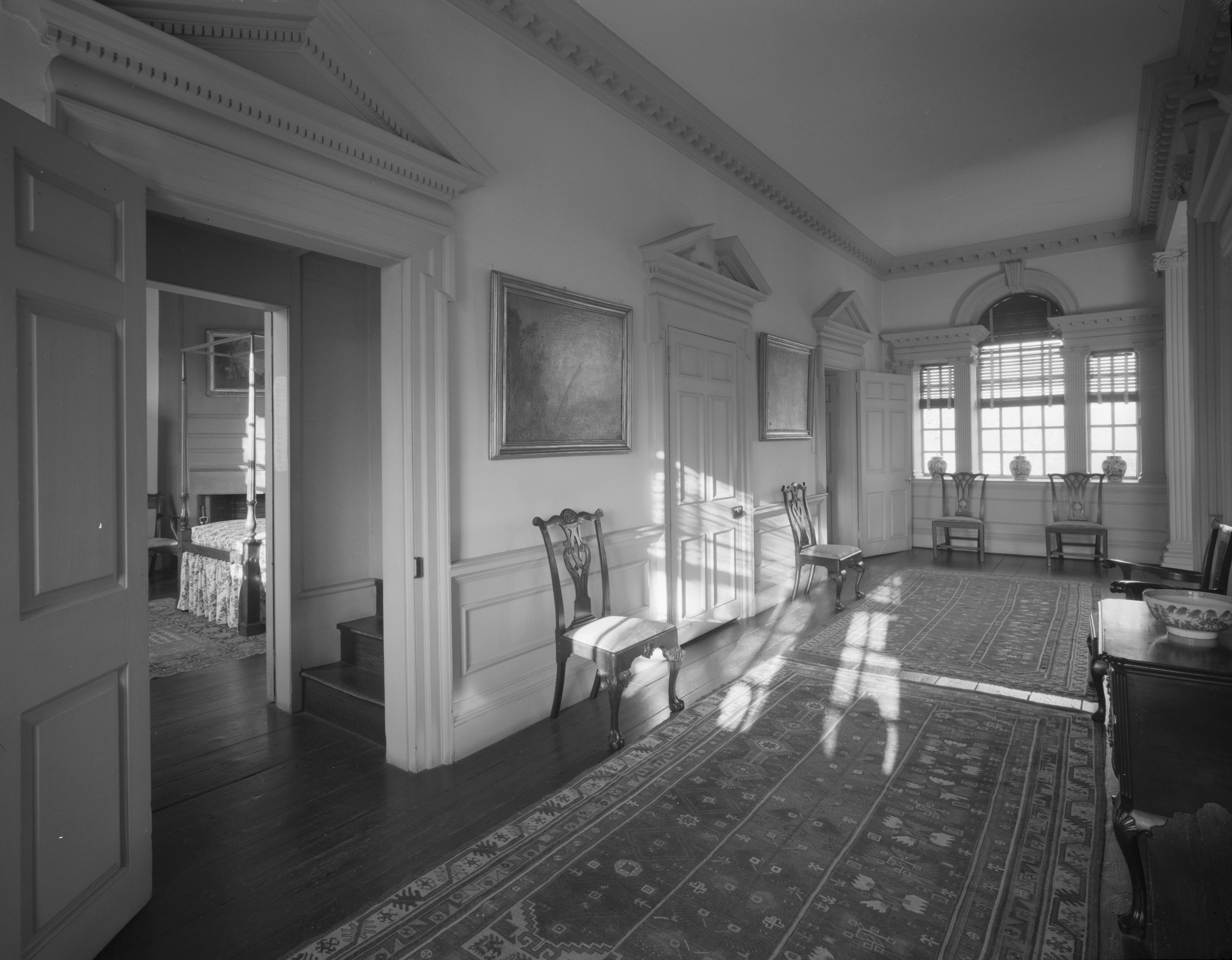
Historic American Buildings Survey, second floor hallway, 1960

== See also ==
- List of houses in Fairmount Park
- English colonial architecture in America
- List of National Historic Landmarks in Pennsylvania
- National Register of Historic Places listings in North Philadelphia
