= David McPherson =

David McPherson may refer to:

- Dave McPherson (footballer) (born 1964), former Scottish international footballer
- David McPherson (footballer) (1872–?), Scottish international footballer
- Dave McPherson (musician) (born 1982), English rock musician
- David McPherson (Paralympian), Australian Paralympic athlete
- David Murdoch McPherson (1847–1915), Canadian farmer, manufacturer and political figure
- David McPherson (Nova Scotia politician) (1832-1914), Canadian shipbuilder and politician

== See also ==
- David Macpherson (disambiguation)
