= John Macpherson (privateer) =

Scottish privateer

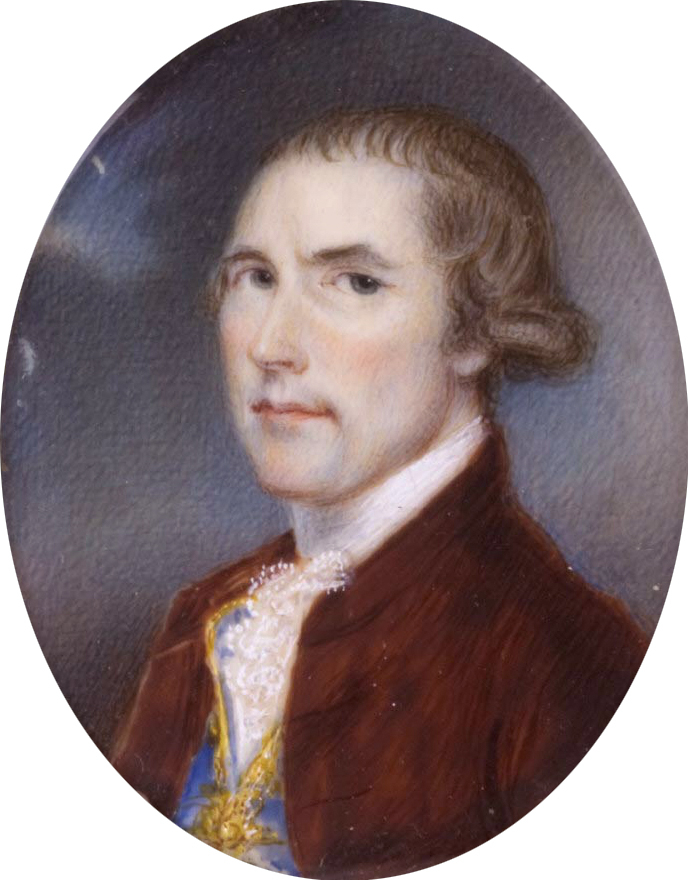
- Macpherson, pictured around 1760
- Born: 1726; Edinburgh, Scotland
- Died: September 6, 1792 (aged 65 or 66); Philadelphia, Pennsylvania, U.S.
- Resting place: Old St. Paul's Episcopal Church Cemetery, Philadelphia, Pennsylvania, U.S.
- Occupation: privateer
- Spouse(s): Margaret Rogers (1752–1770; her death); Mary Ann MacNeal (1772–1792; his death)

John Macpherson (1726—September 6, 1792) was a Scottish-born privateer. After emigrating to colonial America, he built Mount Pleasant in Philadelphia, Pennsylvania, in 1762.

== Early life and career ==
Macpherson was born in 1726 in Skinner's Close, Edinburgh, Scotland, as the second son of William Macpherson and Jane Anderson. His paternal uncle was Lachlan Macpherson, fourth Laird of Nuid and the eleventh chief of Clan Macpherson.

In 1746, aged about 20, he emigrated to colonial America, arriving in Philadelphia.

He became commander of the twenty-gun British privateer Britannia in 1751.

In 1752, he married Margaret Rogers, with whom he had four children: John, William, Margaret and Mary. Daughter Margaret married major John Berrien.

Between 1757 and 1760, Macpherson sailed around the Caribbean, amassing a fortune from his trade. His capture of the Desire in February 1758 was reported to have been his seventh recent capture of "vessels of various sorts".

In 1762, he resigned his position on the Britannia, having been seriously injured on several occasions, including having an arm shot off twice.

The 1763 Treaty of Paris banned privateering.

He published the country's first trade paper, Philadelphia Price Current, in which tradespeople could list their stock prices.

Macpherson built the Mount Pleasant mansion in Philadelphia. It was completed around 1762.

In 1769, he was confined to his home in a strait jacket. His wife died the following year.

He married for a second time in 1772, to Mary Ann MacNeal, with whom he had six more children: Charles, Amelia Sophia, Mary Ann, John Montgomery, Eliza Gates and Robert Hector.

Son John, from his first marriage, was killed in the Battle of Quebec in 1775.

In 1778, Macpherson leased Mount Pleasant to Spanish minister Juan de Miralles.

Macpherson published the first directory of numbered houses in Philadelphia in 1785.

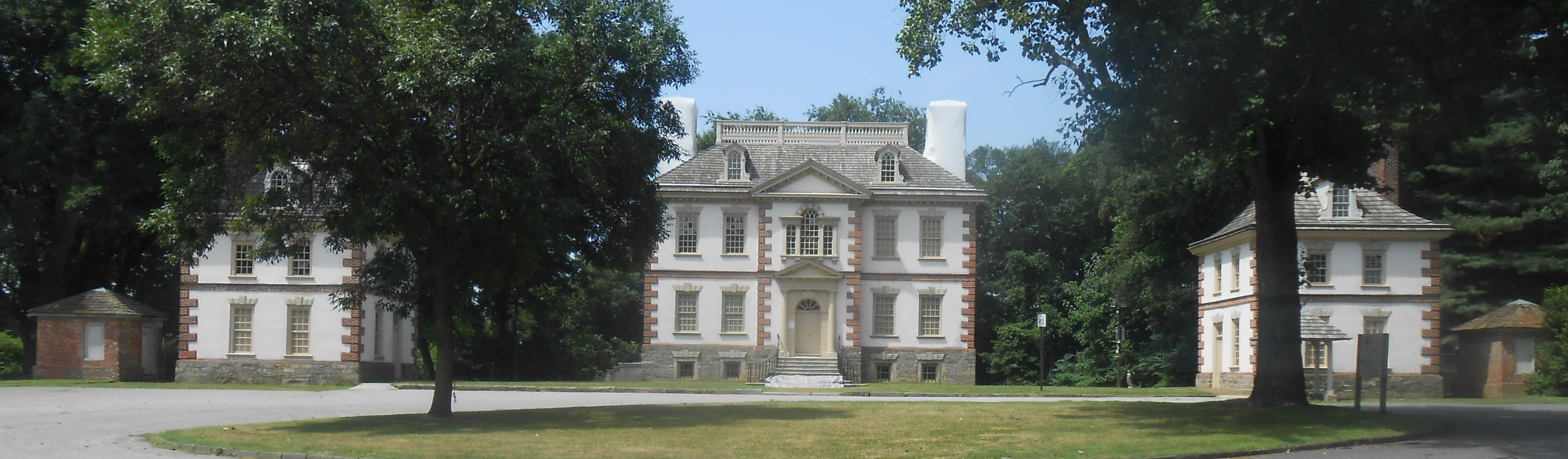
Mount Pleasant, pictured in 2014

=== Death ===
Macpherson died on September 6, 1792, aged 65 or 66. He is buried in the cemetery of Philadelphia's Old St Paul's Church. His wife survived him by 36 years.
