= Bill McPherson (disambiguation) =

Bill McPherson (1897–1976) was a Scottish-American soccer player.

Bill McPherson may also refer to:

- Bill McPherson (American football) (1931–2020), American football coach
- Bill McPherson (footballer), Scottish footballer for Liverpool F.C.
- Bill McPherson (musician), saxophonist and clarinetist active from the 1960s to the 2000s

== See also ==
- William McPherson (disambiguation)
