= John McPherson (disambiguation) =

John McPherson (1860–1897), was the first Labor Party leader of South Australia.

John McPherson may also refer to:

- John R. McPherson (1833–1897), United States Senator from New Jersey
- John Bayard McPherson (1846–1919), United States federal judge
- John McPherson (Clydesdale footballer) (fl. 1875), Scottish footballer
- John McPherson (footballer, born 1855) (1855–1934), Scottish footballer
- John McPherson (footballer, born 1867) (1867–?), Scottish footballer
- John McPherson (footballer, born 1868) (1868–1926), Scottish footballer
- John McPherson (baseball) (1869–1941), American baseball player
- John McPherson (Canadian politician) (1855–1944), Canadian politician, MLA for Stony Plain, Alberta, 1905–1913
- John McPherson (cartoonist), creator of the syndicated comic strip Close to Home
- John McPherson (cinematographer) (1941-2007), American cinematographer

== See also ==
- John MacPherson (disambiguation)
