= John Macpherson (physician) =

Scottish physician

- Born: 1817; Old Aberdeen, Scotland
- Died: 17 March 1890 (aged 72–73); London, England
- Occupation: Physician

John Macpherson (1817 – 17 March 1890) was a Scottish physician.

== Biography ==
Macpherson was the younger brother of Samuel Charters Macpherson, and son of Hugh Macpherson, professor of Greek in the university of Aberdeen. He was born at Old Aberdeen in 1817, and after education at the grammar school, entered the university, graduated M.A., and was created an honorary M.D. He studied medicine at St. George's Hospital in London, and at a school in Kinnerton Street, from 1835 to 1838. He then went abroad, to Bonn, Vienna, and Berlin, for a year. In October 1839 he became a member of the Royal College of Surgeons of England. While in India, he published Statistics of Dysentery, 1850; Insanity among Europeans, 1853; Report on Native Lunatic Asylums, 1855; On Antiperiodics, 1856; and on his return, Cholera in its Home, 1866; Our Baths and Wells of Europe, 1871; Annals of Cholera up to 1817, 1884; and a privately printed Essay on Celtic Names. He believed that no drug had any effect upon cholera, and he differed from many writers in holding that cholera was observed in India as early as 1503. He travelled much in the British islands and on the continent, making the observations recorded in his books on Baths and Wells. His last journey was in 1859 to the south of Spain. He knew French and German well, but not Gaelic, although he was interested in Celtic studies. He lived in London, in Curzon Street, and there died after a long illness on 17 March 1890.
