= Innovation and business in upstate New York =

Innovation in upstate New York

Upstate New York has been the setting for inventions and businesses of international significance. The abundance of water power and the advent of canal and rail transportation provided nineteenth century upstate New York entrepreneurs with the means to power factories and send their products to market. In the twentieth century, hydroelectric power and the New York State Thruway served the same roles. In April 2021, GlobalFoundries, a company specializing in the semiconductor industry, moved its headquarters from Silicon Valley, California to its most advanced semiconductor-chip manufacturing facility in Saratoga County, New York near a section of the Adirondack Northway, in Malta, New York.

== Inventors and business leaders ==
- George Herman Babcock, born in Unadilla Forks, co-invented an improved safety water tube steam boiler. Together with Stephen Wilcox he founded the Babcock & Wilcox boiler company.
- Robert C. Baker, the "Thomas Edison of poultry," a Lansing native and food science professor at Cornell University.
- Katharine Burr Blodgett of Schenectady was the first woman to be awarded a Ph.D. in Physics from University of Cambridge in 1926. After receiving her master's degree, she was hired by General Electric, where she invented low-reflectance "invisible" glass.
- James Bogardus, born in Catskill, was an inventor and architect, the pioneer of American cast-iron architecture.
- Charles F. Brannock of Syracuse was the inventor and manufacturer of the familiar Brannock Device for measuring the foot.
- Willard Bundy, the inventor of the time clock for recording employee working hours.
- Theodore Burr
- William Seward Burroughs I, born in Rochester, was an inventor.
- Paolo Busti
- John Warren Butterfield (1801–1869) was an operator of stagecoach and freight lines in the mid-19th century in the American Northeast and Southwest. He founded companies that became American Express and Wells Fargo.
- Willis Carrier, the inventor of air conditioning, Cornell graduate, invented air conditioning while in Buffalo
- Theodore Case of Auburn is known for the invention of the Movietone sound-on-film sound film system.
- William Russell Case of Little Valley, founder of the cutlery company that bears his name
- George Cogar of Herkimer
- Harry Coover, inventor of Krazy Glue
- Ezra Cornell
- Erastus Corning
- Charles Crocker
- George Crum, the head chef of Moon's Lake House, a resort in Saratoga Springs, and the inventor of the potato chip.
- Glenn Curtiss
- Abner Doubleday
- Charles F. Dowd of Saratoga Springs, who first proposed standard time zones for American railroads
- Frederick W. Eames of Watertown, inventor of a vacuum brake for railroad cars. His company was reorganized as the New York Air Brake company, which continues to operate.
- George Eastman
- Joseph Ellicott
- William Fargo, Mayor of Buffalo and founder of the American Express Company
- Henry Farnam, born in Scipio
- Dr. Konstantin Frank, viticulturalist
- Carl Frink of Clayton, an innovator in the snow plow manufacturing industry
- Robert Fulton, whose steamboat the Clermont (steamboat) served the Hudson River between New York City and Albany
- Orville Gibson
- Dr. B. F. Goodrich, founder of the tire company that bears his name, was born in Ripley.
- Stephen Gordon, Plattsburgh native and founder of Restoration Hardware
- Jay Gould of Roxbury, a financier who became a leading American railroad developer and speculator.
- William Henry Gunlocke, furniture manufacturer
- George Franklin Grant, born in Oswego and the inventor of the modern golf tee
- Wilson Greatbatch, who advanced the development of the pacemaker
- Seth Green, pioneer in fish farming, inventor of the fish hatchery
- Robert Gundlach, born near Buffalo, made prolific contributions to the field of xerography, specifically the development of the modern photocopier. Gundlach helped transform the Haloid Company, a small photographic firm, into the Xerox Corporation.
- Jesse Hawley of Geneva, influential proponent of the Erie Canal
- Herman Hollerith, born in Buffalo, a statistician who developed a mechanical tabulator based on punched cards. His company was eventually merged into others to form IBM.
- Birdsill Holly
- Mark Hopkins, Jr.
- the Houghton family of the Corning Glass Works
- Elbert Hubbard
- Jeremy Jacobs, founder of Delaware North Companies, and his family
- John B. Jervis
- John Augustus Just
- John D. Larkin of the Larkin Soap Company, who commissioned the Larkin Administration Building from Frank Lloyd Wright
- William Pryor Letchworth, founder of Pratt & Letchworth malleable ironworks and creator of Letchworth State Park.
- Edwin Albert Link
- Darwin D. Martin
- David Maydole, blacksmith and inventor of adz-eye hammer construction method. He founded the Maydole Hammer Factory, once the largest hammer factory in the nation, in Norwich.
- William Henry Miner, railroad equipment manufacturer, philanthropist, founder of the Miner Institute at Heart's Delight Farm in Chazy
- Hannah Lord Montague of Troy, inventor of the detachable shirt collar
- Robert Moog, who invented the music synthesizer while a graduate student at Cornell University. He founded his company Moog Music in Trumansburg.
- Edward John Noble, born in Gouverneur, founder of the Life Savers Candy Company and the American Broadcasting Company
- Carl Paladino, founder of the Ellicott Development Co.
- Ralph Peo, Chairman of Houdaille Industries, inventor of early Automobile air conditioning and shock absorbers
- Karl Peterson, founder of the Crescent Tool Company of Jamestown, New York, maker of Crescent wrenches.
- Francis Ashbury Pratt, born in Peru, was a mechanical engineer, inventor, and cofounder of Pratt & Whitney.
- Zadock Pratt, from Prattsville, was a tanner, banker, soldier, and member of the United States House of Representatives.
- Robert C. Pruyn
- Eliphalet Remington, firearms and typewriter manufacturer. The Remington typewriter, later manufactured by Remington Rand, was the first typewriter to use the QWERTY keyboard layout,
- Robert E. Rich, Sr. of Buffalo, was a food-processing pioneer who, in 1945, invented the first non-dairy whipped topping that could be frozen.
- Julius Sämann, inventor of Little Trees
- Steven Sasson, the inventor of the digital camera
- Ben Serotta, builder of custom racing bicycle
- Isaac Singer, founder of the Singer Sewing Machine Company
- L. C. Smith, typewriter innovator and founder of the company that became Smith-Corona
- Elmer Ambrose Sperry, born at Cincinnatus, was a prolific inventor and entrepreneur], most famous as co-inventor, with Herman Anschütz-Kaempfe of the gyrocompass.
- Edward C. Stearns
- Charles Proteus Steinmetz
- Walter S. Taylor, founder of Bully Hill Vineyards
- Spencer Trask, Saratoga Springs venture capitalist and philanthropist, who backed Thomas Edison, rescued the New York Times and founded the artists' colony Yaddo
- Hamdi Ulukaya
- Webster Wagner, an inventor of the railroad sleeping car and the parlor car. Born in Palatine Bridge, he founded the Webster Palace Car Company in Buffalo
- Thomas J. Watson of IBM
- Henry Wells, founder of American Express, Wells Fargo, and Wells College
- George West, "The Paper Bag King"
- George Westinghouse, born in Central Bridge
- Samuel Wilson, namesake of Uncle Sam
- Jethro Wood, inventor of a cast-iron plow with replaceable parts
- Frank Winfield Woolworth
- Benjamin Wright
- Linus Yale, Jr., Inventor of the Yale Lock
- Owen D. Young, founder of RCA

== Inventions ==
- the Adirondack chair
- Automobile air conditioning
- the Brannock Device
- the chicken nugget
- the chicken barbecue
- the detachable collar
- the digital camera
- CorningWare
- the Dewey Decimal System
- the fish hatchery
- the five and dime
- the flight simulator
- Jell-O
- Krazy Glue, invented by Harry Coover while working at Eastman Kodak in 1942.
- The Lightning sailboat. The design was commissioned by the Skaneateles Boat Company, who then first produced it.
- Little Trees, the pine-tree-shaped air freshener for cars
- the square-bottomed paper bag
- the mail chute
- Pepto-Bismol
- the photocopier, introduced by the Rochester firm Xerox in 1949
- Pie a la Mode
- the pin tumbler lock
- the plank road
- the potato chip
- powdered milk
- the punched card and the keypunch
- the roll of film
- the Shock absorber
- the Shot Clock, first used in basketball by the National Basketball Association's Syracuse Nationals
- Standard time zones for American railroads
- the talking movie
- the time recording clock and the time card
- Unguentine, introduced In 1893 to the medical profession by Norwich Pharmaceuticals as the first antiseptic surgical dressing.
- the gasoline pump shut-off valve

== Products and manufacturers ==
- The Adirondack baseball bat, made in Dolgeville, New York, of local white ash, originally by the McLaughlin-Millard Company McLaughlin-Millard was bought by the Rawlings company in 1975. The bats, now labeled Rawlings Adirondack, are used by about one-third of major leaguers.
- Bicycles, built in Syracuse by the E. C. Stearns Bicycle Agency. For a period in the 1890s, Stearns was the largest manufacturer of bicycles in the world.
- Buffalo Forge Company, manufacturers of forges, drills, fans and other machinery
- Arrow shirts
- Carrier Corporation
- Cool Whip, manufactured in Avon
- The Crescent Wrench, originally the brand name for the product of the Crescent Tool Company of Jamestown.The term crescent wrench has become a generic term in North America for any adjustable wrench.
- R. E. Dietz Company
- Endicott Johnson Corporation
- Fisher-Price Toys
- IBM
- Kittinger Company, maker of colonial reproduction furniture
- Locomotives, built in Schenectady by the American Locomotive Company
- Mohawk Industries
- Nickelodeon, the first children's television channel, was introduced in Buffalo under the name "Pinwheel" in 1977. After going nationwide, it later moved to Florida and then to California.
- Rosendale cement
- Sailplanes, made by Schweizer Aircraft in Horseheads
- Salt, made from brine in Syracuse and mined in Western New York
- Shock absorbers, manufactured by Houdaille Industries
- Shredded Wheat was invented by Henry Perky of Denver, Colorado. He and William Henry Ford of Watertown, working in Watertown, invented and patented the first machinery for the production of Shredded Wheat. In 1901, drawn by inexpensive electrical power for baking, Perky built a new plant at Niagara Falls. A representation of the factory appeared on the Shredded Wheat boxes for decades.
- Smith Corona
- Trico, windshield wiper
- M. Wile & Co., manufacturer of men's suits
- The Wurlitzer organ and jukebox, made in North Tonawanda
