= Just One =

Just One may refer to:

- Just One (album), a 1997 album by Better Than a Thousand
  - "Just One" (song), a 1997 song by Better Than a Thousand, the title track from the preceding album
- "Just One", a song by Hoobastank from their 2003 album The Reason
- Just One (board game), a comparative party board game for 3 to 7 players released in 2018
- Just One (rapper), a Swiss rapper, a member of the Swiss hiphop group Sens Unik

== See also ==
- 1 (disambiguation)
- One (disambiguation)
- Just (disambiguation)
- Just One Thing, BBC radio show
- Just One More (disambiguation)
- Just One More Thing (disambiguation)
- Just Once (disambiguation)
