= One More Thing =

One More Thing may refer to:

- One more thing, a phrase used by Steve Jobs to introduce products during speeches
- One More Thing (Lime Garden album), 2024
- One More Thing (Steve Ashley album), 2016
- "One More Thing", a song by Zion I from his 2003 album Deep Water Slang V2.0

== See also ==
- One Thing More, a 1986 stageplay by Christopher Fry
- The One Thing More, a 2000 novel by Anne Perry
- "There's One Thing More", a 1961 song by The Allisons off the single record "Are You Sure?"
- Just One Thing, BBC radio show
- Just One More Thing (disambiguation)
- Just One More (disambiguation)
- One Thing (disambiguation)
- One More (disambiguation)
