= Just Once (disambiguation) =

Just Once is a 1981 song and single by Quincy Jones.

Just Once may also refer to:

- "Just Once" (David Lee Murphy song), a 1994 song by David Lee Murphy
- Just Once (EP), a 2011 EP record by How to Dress Well (Tom Krell)

== See also ==
- Just (disambiguation)
- Once (disambiguation)
- Just Once in My Life (disambiguation)
- Just One (disambiguation)
