= One More =

One More may refer to:

- "One More" (song), a 2014 song by Elliphant, featuring MØ
- "One More" (The Walking Dead), 2021 season 10 episode 19 of the television series The Walking Dead
- "One More", a 2021 song by SG Lewis, featuring Nile Rodgers, from the album Times

== See also ==
- Just One More Thing (disambiguation)
- Just One More (disambiguation)
- One More Thing (disambiguation)
- One More Time (disambiguation)
- Once More (disambiguation)
