= Just Once in My Life =

Just Once in My Life may refer to:

- "Just Once in My Life" (song), 1965 single by the Righteous Brothers
- Just Once in My Life (album), 1965 album by the Righteous Brothers

== See also ==
- For Once in My Life (disambiguation)
- Once in a Lifetime (disambiguation)
- Just Once (disambiguation)
