= Dave Jenks =

American author and business person (1942–2021)

- Born: 1942; Lockport, New York
- Died: September 14, 2021 (aged 78–79)
- Occupations: Author, real estate expert

Dave Jenks (July 9, 1942 – September 14, 2021) was an American author and business person.

In 2003, with the release of The Millionaire Real Estate Agent, co-authored by Gary Keller and Jay Papasan, Jenks became a best-selling author when the book spent time on BusinessWeek's best-seller list. In 2005, they co-authored their second book, The Millionaire Real Estate Investor, which reached The New York Times best-seller list, as well as BusinessWeek's best-seller list.

== History ==
Prior to joining Keller Williams in 1996, Jenks was president and CEO of Century 21 South Central States, based in Dallas, Texas. Jenks has been in the real estate industry since 1981, has taught for the Dale Carnegie Institute, and owned his own training company, The Leadership Connection Inc.

Jenks died on September 14, 2021, after filing a do not resuscitate order. He had been suffering from a melanoma and COVID-19 when he died.

== Selected works ==
- The Millionaire Real Estate Agent (with Gary Keller and Jay Papasan). New York: McGraw-Hill, 2004. ISBN 978-0-07-144404-0
- The Millionaire Real Estate Investor (with Gary Keller and Jay Papasan). New York: McGraw-Hill, 2005. ISBN 978-0-07-144637-2
- Your First Home: The Proven Path to Home Ownership (with Gary Keller and Jay Papasan). New York: McGraw-Hill, 2007. ISBN 978-0-07-154621-8
- SHIFT: How Top Real Estate Agents Tackle Tough Times (with Gary Keller and Jay Papasan). New York: McGraw-Hill, 2008. ISBN 978-0-07-160527-4
