= One Thing =

One Thing or The One Thing may refer to:

== Albums ==
- The One Thing (album), a 1993 album by Michael Bolton
- One Thing, a 1989 album by Sylvia Juncosa

== Songs ==
- "One Thing" (Alicia Keys song), 2012
- "One Thing" (Finger Eleven song), 2003
- "One Thing" (Gravity Kills song), 2002
- "One Thing" (One Direction song), 2012
- "1 Thing", a 2005 song by Amerie
- "The One Thing" (INXS song), 1982
- "The One Thing" (Shakira song), 2014
- "One Thing", a song by Beach House from their 2015 album Thank Your Lucky Stars
- "One Thing", a song by Soulsavers from their 2015 album Angels & Ghosts
- "One Thing", a song by Hellyeah from their 2007 album Hellyeah
- "One Thing", a song by Nothingface from their 1997 album Pacifier
- "One Thing", a song by Lola Young from her 2025 album I'm Only F**king Myself
- "1 Thing", a song by STAYC from their 2024 album Metamorphic

== Other uses ==
- The One Thing (book), 2013 non-fiction self-help book

== See also ==
- One More Thing (disambiguation)
- Just One Thing, BBC radio show
- Thing 1, a fictional character from Dr. Seuss' The Cat In The Hat
