= Justh =

Justh is a surname. Notable people with the surname include:

- Gyula Justh (1850–1917), Hungarian jurist and politician
- Gyula Justh (1887–1955), Hungarian actor
- Ina Justh (born 1969), German rower
- Zsigmond Justh (1863–1894), Hungarian writer

== See also ==
- Just (surname)
