= Just One More =

Just One More may refer to:

- Just One More (album), an album by Mad Caddies
- "Just One More" (song), a 1956 song by George Jones
- "Just One More", a 2022 song by Nickelback from Get Rollin'

== See also ==
- Just One More Thing (disambiguation)
- One More Thing (disambiguation)
- One More (disambiguation)
- Just One (disambiguation)
