= One More Time =

One More Time may refer to:

== Film and television ==
- One More Time (1931 film), a Merrie Melodies cartoon
- One More Time (1970 film), a film by Jerry Lewis
- One More Time, a 1974 TV special with Carol Channing, Pearl Bailey, and others
- One More Time (2015 film), a film by Robert Edwards
- One More Time (1969 TV series), a 1969–1970 Canadian music program
- One More Time (2024 TV series), a Canadian sitcom starring D.J. Demers
- One More Time (South Korean TV series), a 2016 South Korean web series

=== Episodes ===
- "One More Time" (The A-Team)
- "One More Time" (The Cosby Show)
- "One More Time" (Second Thoughts)
- "One More Time" (The Vice)
- "One More Time", an episode of The Education of Max Bickford

== Music ==
- One Mo' Time (musical), a 1979 Broadway musical revue by Vernel Bagneris
- One More Time (band), a Swedish pop group

=== Albums ===
- One More Time (One More Time album), 1994
- One More Time (Real McCoy album), 1997
- One More Time..., a 2023 album by Blink-182
- One More Time – Live in Utrecht 1992, a 1999 album by Procol Harum
- One More Time: The MCA Recordings, a 2000 album by Kelly Willis
- Basie One More Time, a 1959 album by the Count Basie Orchestra
- One Mo' Time (album), a 2004 album by The Black Sorrows
- One More Time (Aerosmith and Yungblud EP), 2025
- One More Time (Super Junior EP), 2018
- One More Time, a 1962 album by Eddy Arnold
- One More Time, a 2000 album by UMO Jazz Orchestra, Kenny Wheeler, and Norma Winstone
- One More Time, a 1999 album by Ronald Cheng

=== Songs ===
- "One More Time" (1931 song)
- "One More Time" (Them song), 1965
- "One More Time" (Blink-182 song), 2023
- "One More Time" (Craig David song), 2016
- "One More Time" (Daft Punk song), 2000
- "One More Time" (Diesel song), 1992
- "One More Time" (HammerFall song), 2011
- "One More Time" (Benjamin Ingrosso song), 2017
- "One More Time" (Joe Jackson song), 1979
- "One More Time" (Alison Moyet song), 2007
- "One More Time" (Laura Pausini song), 1999
- "One More Time" (Porno Graffitti song), 2011
- "One More Time" (Real McCoy song), 1997
- "One More Time" (Machel Montano song), 2007
- "One More Time" (Twice song), 2017
- "One More Time (The Sunshine Song)", 2000
- "One More Time", by AllDay Project from AllDay Project, 2025
- "One More Time", by Ariel Pink's Haunted Graffiti from Scared Famous/FF»
- "One More Time", by Badfinger from Airwaves, 1979
- “One More Time”, by Carly Simon from Carly Simon
- "One More Time", by the Carpenters from A Kind of Hush, 1976
- "One More Time", by the Clash from Sandinista!, 1980
- "One More Time", by the Cure from Kiss Me, Kiss Me, Kiss Me, 1987
- "One More Time", by Estelle from Lovers Rock, 2018
- "One More Time", by I Prevail from Lifelines, 2016
- "One More Time", by James LaBrie from the album Static Impulse, 2010
- "One More Time", by Jamie Drastik with Pitbull, 2011
- "One More Time", by Kenny G from Paradise, 2002
- "One More Time", by Korn from Untouchables, 2002
- "One More Time", by Kylie Minogue from Tension, 2023
- "One More Time", by the Lemonheads from Car Button Cloth, 1996
- "One More Time", by Lynyrd Skynyrd from Street Survivors, 1977
- "One More Time", by Max Coveri
- "One More Time", by Michael Bolton from the soundtrack of the film Sing, 1989
- "One More Time", by Nancy Sinatra from Woman
- "One More Time", by Rod Stewart from album The Tears of Hercules, 2021
- "One More Time", by Sam Cooke from the B-side of the single "Twistin' the Night Away"
- "One More Time", by Jeff Lynne's ELO from From Out of Nowhere, 2019

== Other media ==
- One More Time (book), a 1986 memoir by Carol Burnett

== See also ==
- ...Baby One More Time (disambiguation)
- One More Time, OK? (Korean: Hanbeon deo, OK?), a 2007 album by The Grace
- One Time (disambiguation)
- Repeat (disambiguation)
