= Jay Papasan =

American author and business executive

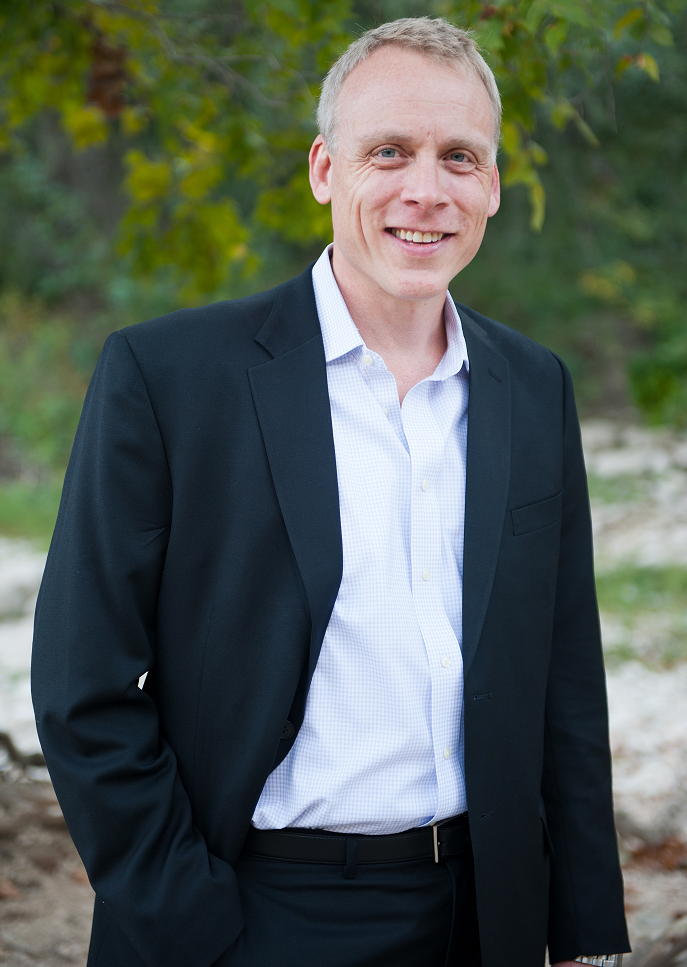
- Education: New York University; University of Memphis
- Occupations: Author; Business Executive
- Employer: KellerINK
- Spouse: Wendy Papasan
- Website: JayPapasan.com

Jay Papasan is an American writer and business executive. He is best known for co-authoring, with Gary Keller, books such as The Millionaire Real Estate Investor, which both became a New York Times best-seller and a BusinessWeek best-seller, and The ONE Thing, which reached #1 on the Wall Street Journal business best-seller list. Papasan is the vice president of publishing and executive editor at KellerINK, the publishing arm of Keller Williams Realty. He and his wife Wendy are owners of The Papasan Real Estate Team. In 2014 he was named one of the Most Powerful People in Real Estate by Swanepoel Power 200.

== Early life and education ==
In an interview Papasan recalled typing on an old manual typewriter when he was 12 years old. He attended the Harding Academy in Memphis, Tennessee, graduating in 1987. Papasan attended the University of Memphis where his roommate encouraged him to expand his vocabulary using word habits. After earning his degree in English and French, he traveled to France where he worked as a translator for two and a half years. Papasan was only allowed to work 20 hours a week which was the maximum allowed in the country for the visa he was on, and used his free time to write short stories. He returned from France to attend New York University, earning a master's degree from its graduate writing program.

== Career ==
After graduating from NYU, Papasan took a job as an editorial assistant at New Market Press. He then moved on to HarperCollins where he worked several years as an associate editor. While at HarperCollins, he started working with David Hirshey, a 10-year deputy editor at Esquire. It was with Hirshey that Papasan published his first best-seller, Go For the Goal: A Champion's Guide to Winning in Soccer and Life by Mia Hamm.

Papasan moved from New York to Austin, Texas with his wife Wendy in February 2000. He freelanced while looking for work, eventually landing as a newsletter writer for Keller Williams Realty. He worked in various positions within the company, learning about the real estate industry and eventually learning that co-founder Gary Keller was planning to write a book. Papasan ran into Keller and asked him if he was aware that he had previously worked in publishing. He spoke with Keller about Keller's plans to write 14 books, showing him two books that he wanted to model on. After Papasan pointed out to Keller that he in fact edited those books during his days at HarperCollins, Keller hired him to help write and edit their first book together.

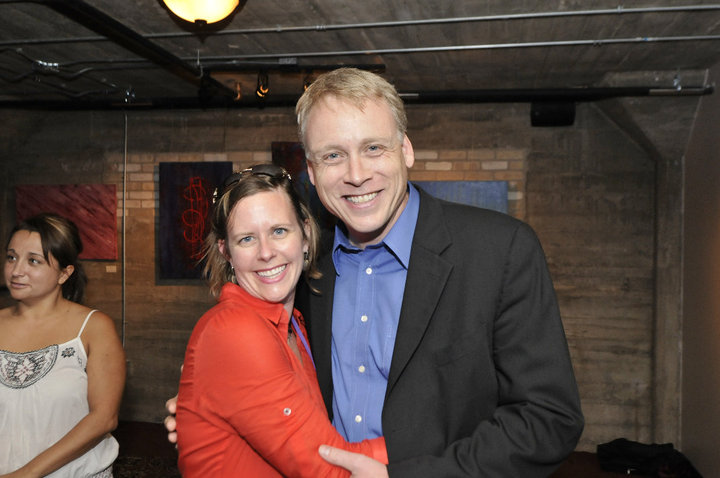
Jay Papasan with his wife Wendy at Keller Williams Realty Mega Camp in 2010.

In 2003, Papasan founded KellerINK along with Gary Keller. The first book published by KellerINK was The Millionaire Real Estate Agent, a book authored by Papasan, Keller, and Dave Jenks in 2004. The book became a BusinessWeek best-seller. He co-authored a second book with Keller and Jenks in 2005. Titled The Millionaire Real Estate Investor, the book appeared on both the BusinessWeek best-seller list and The New York Times Best Seller list.

Papasan continued his writing career in 2007 when he collaborated with Rick Villani and Clay Davis on the book FLIP: How to Buy, Fix and Sell Homes for Profit. The following year he co-authored Your First Home, again with Keller and Jenks, and in 2009, the team wrote SHIFT: How Top Agents Tackle Tough Times, which was Nielsen BookScan's #1 Real Estate Book for 2009. The book also appeared on The Wall Street Journal Business bestseller list and The New York Times Business bestseller list. In 2011, Papasan worked with Buddy Norman to create Shift Commercial: How Top Commercial Brokers Tackle Tough Times. The third book in the "Millionaire" investor series, HOLD: How to Find, Buy, and Rent Houses for Wealth, debuted in 2012 on USA Today's bestselling book list.

Keller and Papasan published their first non-real estate book in April 2013, The ONE Thing: The Surprisingly Simple Truth Behind Extraordinary Results. The book reached #1 on the Wall Street Journal business bestseller list. It was also a bestseller on The New York Times and USA Today bestseller lists. Hudson Booksellers named The ONE Thing one of the five best business interest books of 2013. Papasan has been featured in publications including Forbes and Dave Ramsey's EntreLeadership Review.

Papasan's freelance work has appeared in Texas Monthly and Memphis Magazine.

=== Bibliography ===
Publication year	Title	Original publisher	ISBN	Notes
2004	The Millionaire Real Estate Agent	McGraw Hill	ISBN 9780071502085	Co-Authors Gary Keller & Dave Jenks. BusinessWeek best-seller.
2005	The Millionaire Real Estate Investor	McGraw Hill	ISBN 9780071469531	Co-Authors Gary Keller & Dave Jenks. BusinessWeek and New York Times best-seller.
2007	Your First Home: The Proven Path to Home Ownership	KellerINK	ISBN 9780071546218	
2008	SHIFT: How Top Real Estate Agents Tackle Tough Times	KellerINK	ISBN 9780071605274	Co-Authors Gary Keller & Dave Jenks. New York Times best-seller, the Wall Street Journal Business Bestseller, and the USA Today Bestseller.
2009	Soci@l	KellerINK		Co-Author Ben Kinney. Bronze Award winner at the annual National Association of Real Estate Editors competition in 2011.
2012	HOLD: How to Find, Buy, and Rent Houses for Wealth	KellerINK	ISBN 9780071797047	
2013	The ONE Thing	Bard Press	ISBN 9781848549258	Co-Author Gary Keller. First non real estate book by both authors.
