= For Once in My Life (disambiguation) =

"For Once in My Life" is a song written by Ron Miller and most famously performed by Stevie Wonder.

For Once in My Life may also refer to:

- For Once in My Life (Stevie Wonder album), 1968
- For Once in My Life (Carmen McRae album), 1967
- For Once in My Life (Sylvia Syms album), 1967
- For Once in My Life (Tony Bennett album), 1967
- For Once in My Life, a 1969 live album by Vikki Carr
- For Once in My Life, a 1971 album by Nancy Wilson
- "For Once in My Life" (Mel B song), 2013

== See also ==
- Once in a Lifetime (disambiguation)
