= Lime Garden =

British indie rock band

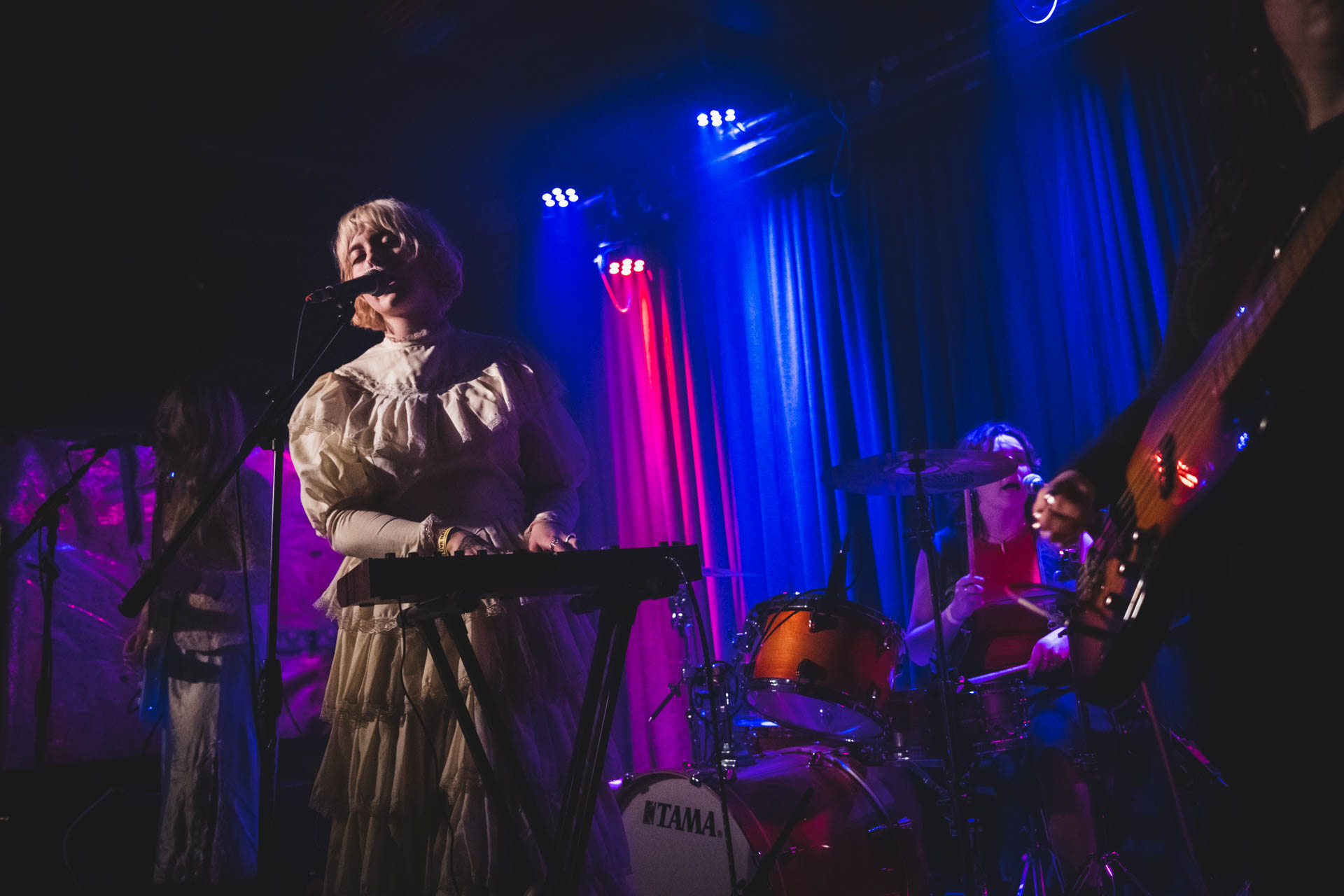
- Lime Garden in 2022

Background information
- Origin: Guildford and Brighton, UK
- Genres: Indie rock; surf rock
- Years active: 2017–present
- Label: So Young
- Members: Chloe Howard; Leila Deeley; Tippi Morgan; Annabel Whittle
- Website: limegarden.bandcamp.com

Lime Garden are a British indie rock band formed in Brighton. Self described as "wonk pop", the band blend a number of genres including disco, pop and surf. They released their debut studio album One More Thing in February 2024.

== History ==
The band met at a college in Guildford and further studied at BIMM Brighton and rebranded from the name LIME. They are signed to So Young Records, a partner label of Communion Records.

Named as one of NME's top 100 artists for 2022, They have played UK festivals including Latitude, Reading and Leeds Festival, Green Man Festival and Standon Calling and have toured with other artists including IDLES, Sunflower Bean and Yard Act.

Lime Garden released their debut studio album One More Thing on 16 February 2024. They have since released four singles for the album: "Nepotism (Baby)", "Love Song", "I Want to Be You" and "Mother".

Their second album Maybe Not Tonight was released on 10 April 2026. They released the first single, "Maybe Not Tonight," on 12 November, 2025. The second single from the album, "23," was released on 20 January, 2026. They stated that "23" is their favorite single they've recorded.

== Artistry ==
The band's members come from different musical backgrounds and draw upon a wide array of influences, including Charli XCX, Bloc Party, Jockstrap and The Japanese House. Howard in particular is a fan of Arctic Monkeys and The Strokes. The band credited "Metronomy, Phoenix, LCD Sound System, MGMT and in more recent years bands like Working Mens Club and PVA" with "[opening] our eyes to the possibilities within indie music". In 2022, Lime Garden praised contemporaries Biig Piig, Fontaines D.C. and Wunderhorse as well as Wolf Alice, and Courtney Barnett.

== Members ==
- Chloe Howard – lead vocals, guitar, synthesizer, sampler, percussion
- Leila Deeley – guitar, backing vocals
- Tippi Morgan – bass, backing vocals
- Annabel Whittle – drums

== Discography ==
Lime Garden discography
- Studio albums: 2
- Singles: 12

=== Albums ===
List of albums
Title	Year	Peak chart positions
Title	Year	UK
One More Thing	2024	—
Maybe Not Tonight	2026	58

=== Singles ===
List of singles
Title	Year	Album
"Surf N Turf"	2020	Non-album singles
"Fever"	2020	Non-album singles
"Sick & Tired"/"Pulp" 7"	2021	Non-album singles
"Clockwork"/"Marbles" 7"	2022	Non-album singles
"Bitter"	2022	Non-album singles
"Nepotism (Baby)"	2023	One More Thing
"Love Song"	2023	One More Thing
"I Want to Be You"	2023	One More Thing
"Mother"	2024	One More Thing
"Pop Star"	2024	One More Thing
"Maybe Not Tonight"	2025	Maybe Not Tonight
"23"	2026	Maybe Not Tonight
"Downtown Lover"	2026	Maybe Not Tonight
"Cross My Heart"	2026	Maybe Not Tonight
"Moving Target"	2026	Non-album singles
