= Ben Kinney =

American businessman (born 1978)

- Occupations: Entrepreneur; Professional speaker Author; Executive; Real estate agent

Ben Kinney is an entrepreneur, professional speaker, author, real estate agent, brokerage owner, and co-founder of PLACE, Inc. that started in Bellingham, Washington and now operates across the U.S., Canada, and the U.K .

He is listed in The Wall Street Journal and REAL Trends' top 1,000 agents from 2011 to 2022. He was the top ranked agent in Washington state in transactional volume from 2012 to 2021.

Kinney is the founder of Ben Kinney Companies commonly referred to as "BKCO" which owns and operates the sales divisions, brokerages, training companies, and the technology firms including NVNTD, Blueroof360, Activerain, Automabots, Brivity, and Blossor.

In 2013, NVNTD purchased Big Fresh Media and Tech Help. In 2015 BKCO purchased KWKLY and Activerain from the Zillow Group. In 2017 BKCO acquired the Salt Lake City technology company Blueroof360 and in August, 2017 they also acquired the San Diego–based AI company, Automabots.

In 2019, Kinney along with Chris Suarez, co-founded the real estate technology platform, Place. In 2021 Goldman Sachs along with 3L invested 100 million dollars into PLACE at over one billion dollars valuation.

== Early life ==
Kinney was born in Everett, Washington, on July 24, 1978. He was the second born child to Dorothy Louise Stine and Michael Byron Kinney. He was raised in a small cabin without indoor plumbing or power in Oso, between Bellingham and Seattle, Washington by his father, Mike Kinney, who was a fly fishing guide and wildlife photographer. Kinney graduated from Granite Falls High School in 1997 before obtaining a two-year associate degree from Everett Community College. While completing his four-year degree at Western Washington University he worked as a cable television installer. He later transitioned into the door to door sales of cable television, telephone and internet services before starting his career in real estate in 2004. In addition to his work in real estate, Kinney is also an entrepreneur and has started several successful businesses. In 2007, he founded ActiveRain, a social networking site for real estate professionals. The site quickly grew in popularity and was acquired by Trulia in 2013.

Kinney has also founded several other companies, including Brivity, which provides software for real estate agents, and Blossor, a health and wellness company.

== Career ==
Kinney became a full-time real estate agent in 2004. Kinney later developed the curriculum for an online real estate designation course named IMSD - Internet Marketing Specialist Designation. He sold the curriculum to MarketLeader a publicly traded company acquired by Trulia, but continued to teach classes through the brands Ben Kinney Training, Re8Expo, and Raincamp.

Kinney created two real estate tech startups, Brivity and Blossor. He was named the 2014 Innovator of the Year by Inman News.

On June 19, 2015, Zillow Group Announced the Sale of ActiveRain and KWKLY to the Ben Kinney Companies.

=== Publications ===
Kinney co-authored Soci@l, an ebook published by Rellek Publishing Partners, with Jay Papasan. Soci@l won a bronze award at the 2011 National Association of Real Estate Editors competition.
