= Just =

Just or JUST may refer to:

== Arts and entertainment ==
- "Just" (song), 1995, by Radiohead
- Just!, Australian author Andy Griffiths' children's story collections
- Just, a 1998 album by Dave Lindholm
- "Just", a 2005 song on Lost and Found by Mudvayne
- "Just", a 2016 song on Melting by Mamamoo

== Businesses ==
- JUST, Inc., an American food manufacturing company
- Just Group, an Australian owner and operator of seven retail brands
- Just Group plc, a British company specialising in retirement products and services

== Education ==
- Jashore University of Science and Technology, Bangladesh
- Jinwen University of Science and Technology, Taiwan
- Jordan University of Science and Technology, Jordan

== People ==
- Just (surname)
- Just (given name)
- List of people known as the Just

== See also ==
- Jus (disambiguation)
- Justice (disambiguation)
- Saint-Just (disambiguation)
