= Once Again =

Once Again may refer to:

== Film and television ==
- Once Again (2012 film), an Indian Hindi-language family drama film
- Once Again (2016 film) or Pinneyum, an Indian Malayalam-language romantic crime drama film
- Once Again (2018 film), an Indian Hindi-language romantic drama film
- Once Again (Philippine TV series), a 2016 romantic fantasy series
- Once Again (South Korean TV series), a 2020 romantic comedy-drama series
- Ghayal: Once Again, a 2016 Indian action film by Sunny Deol and Rahul Rawail
- Phir Se... (lit. 'Once Again...'), a 2018 Indian Hindi-language film by Kunal Kohli and Ajay Bhuyan

== Music ==
=== Albums ===
- Once Again (Barclay James Harvest album), 1971
- Once Again (Fusebox album) or the title song, 2004
- Once Again (John Legend album), 2006
- Once Again (The Kingston Trio album), 2004
- Once Again (Peter Tork and James Lee Stanley album), 2001
- Once Again, by the American Breed, 1986

=== Songs ===
- "1nce Again", by A Tribe Called Quest, 1996
- "Once Again", by Days of the New from Days of the New, 2001
- "Once Again", by Michael Fall from Turn on your radio, 2013
- "Once Again", by Moka Only and Madchild from The Desired Effect, 2005
- "Once Again", by Headhunterz, 2015
- "Once Again", by Quality Control with Lil Yachty and Tee Grizzley from Control the Streets, Volume 2, 2019
- "Phir Se" (lit. 'Once Again'), by Shashwat Sachdev and Arijit Singh from the Indian film Dhurandhar: The Revenge, 2026

== See also ==
- Once and Again, a 1999–2002 American drama television series
- Yamla Pagla Deewana: Phir Se (lit. 'Yamla Pagla Deewana: Once Again'), a 2018 Indian Hindi-language film by Navaniat Singh, third in the Yamla Pagla Deewana film series
- Once More
