= Iron Highway =

The Iron Highway is a rail-based intermodal freight concept developed at New York Air Brake in the mid-1980s and tested by CSL Intermodal in the early 1990s. The Iron Highway system employs specially designed locomotives located at each end of a string of 60-meter articulated platforms that divide in the middle to form ramps for the loading and unloading of regular truck trailers. An objective of the concept is to serve standard trailers and containers that are not reinforced for lift-on/lift-off operations. The principal benefit is to extend the economy of intermodal traffic to distances as short as 200 km. One unpowered prototype was built, and was presumably tested on CSX, and it was moved to Australia afterwards. The fate of this prototype is unknown.
