= E. C. Stearns & Company =

- Company type: Hardware Manufacturing
- Industry: Hardware
- Genre: Hardware, Tools
- Founded: 1864
- Founder: George Noble Sterns (1812-1882) and son Edward C. Stearns (1856-1929)
- Headquarters: Syracuse, Onondaga County, New York, United States
- Area served: United States
- Key people: Son, John Edward Stearns, was secretary of the company in 1929 and had been in active charge of the business since his father, Edward C. Stearns retired a few years earlier
- Products: Hardware, Tools
- Number of employees: 3,500
- Divisions: Stearns Automobile Co., Stearns Steam Carriage Co. (1901-1904); E. C. Stearns Bicycle Agency (1893-1899); Stearns Typewriter Co. (1905-1915)

E. C. Stearns & Company was a manufacturer of tools and hardware in Syracuse, New York and was organized in 1864 as George N. Stearns Company by George N. Stearns, a wagon maker. During the early years, the company was principally involved in the production of hollow iron tools and specialties, hollow augers, and saw vises.

== Advertisements ==
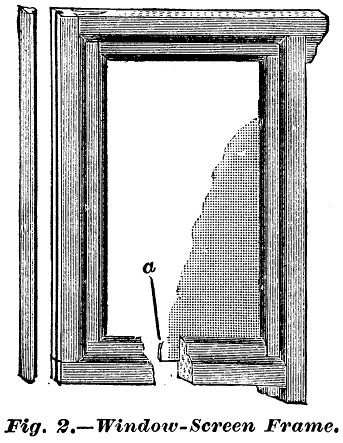
E. C. Stearns & Company - Window screen frame - The Manufacturer and Builder, March 1888

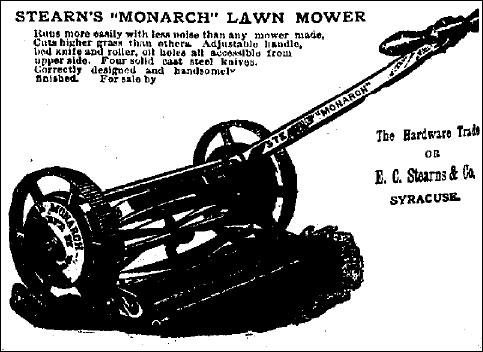
E. C. Stearns & Company - "Monarch" lawn mower, 1890

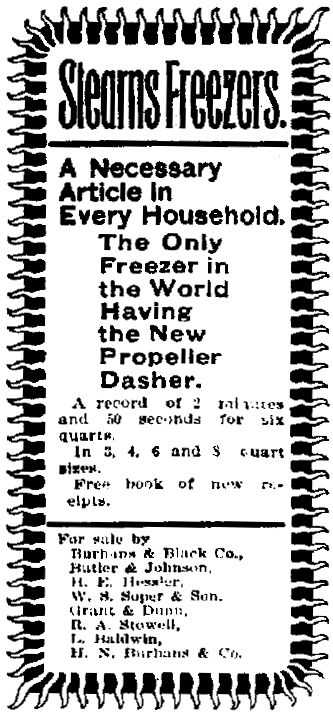
E. C. Stearns & Company - Freezer - 1897

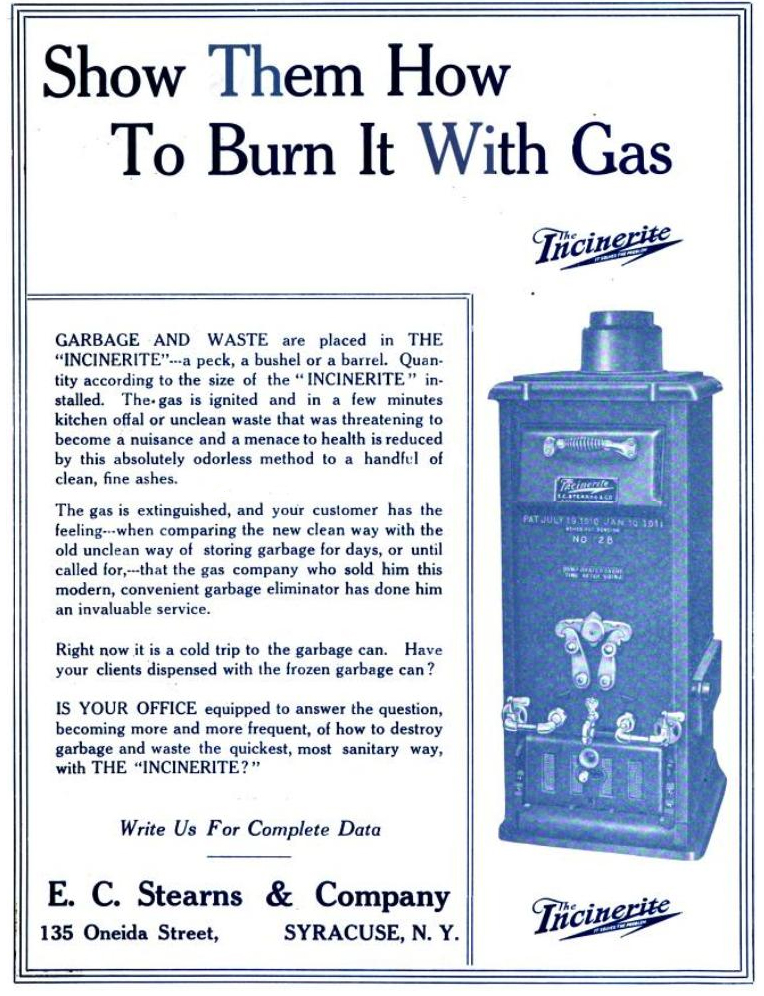
E. C. Stearns & Company - Incinerate - 1919

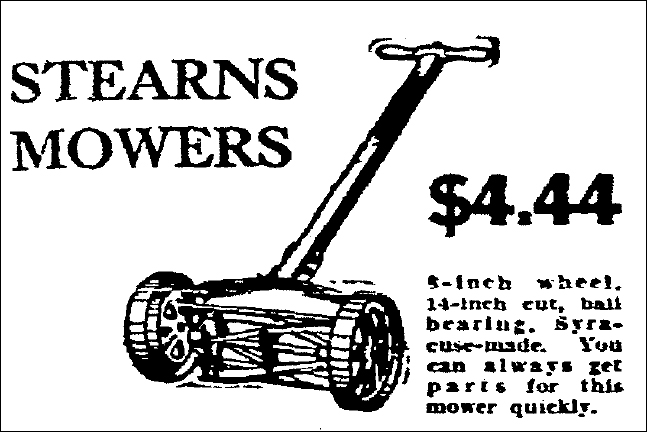
Stearns lawn mower - Made in Syracuse, New York - 1934

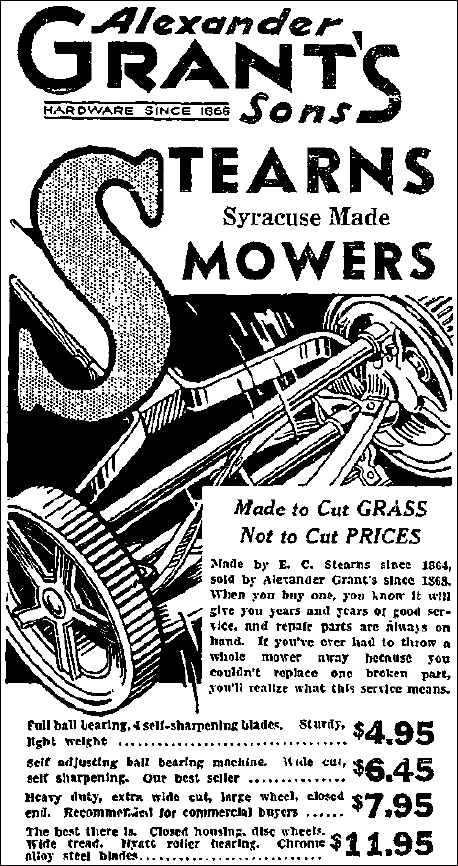
Stearns lawn mower - Alexander Grant & Son - 1936
