= Gary W. Keller =

American business writer

Gary Keller
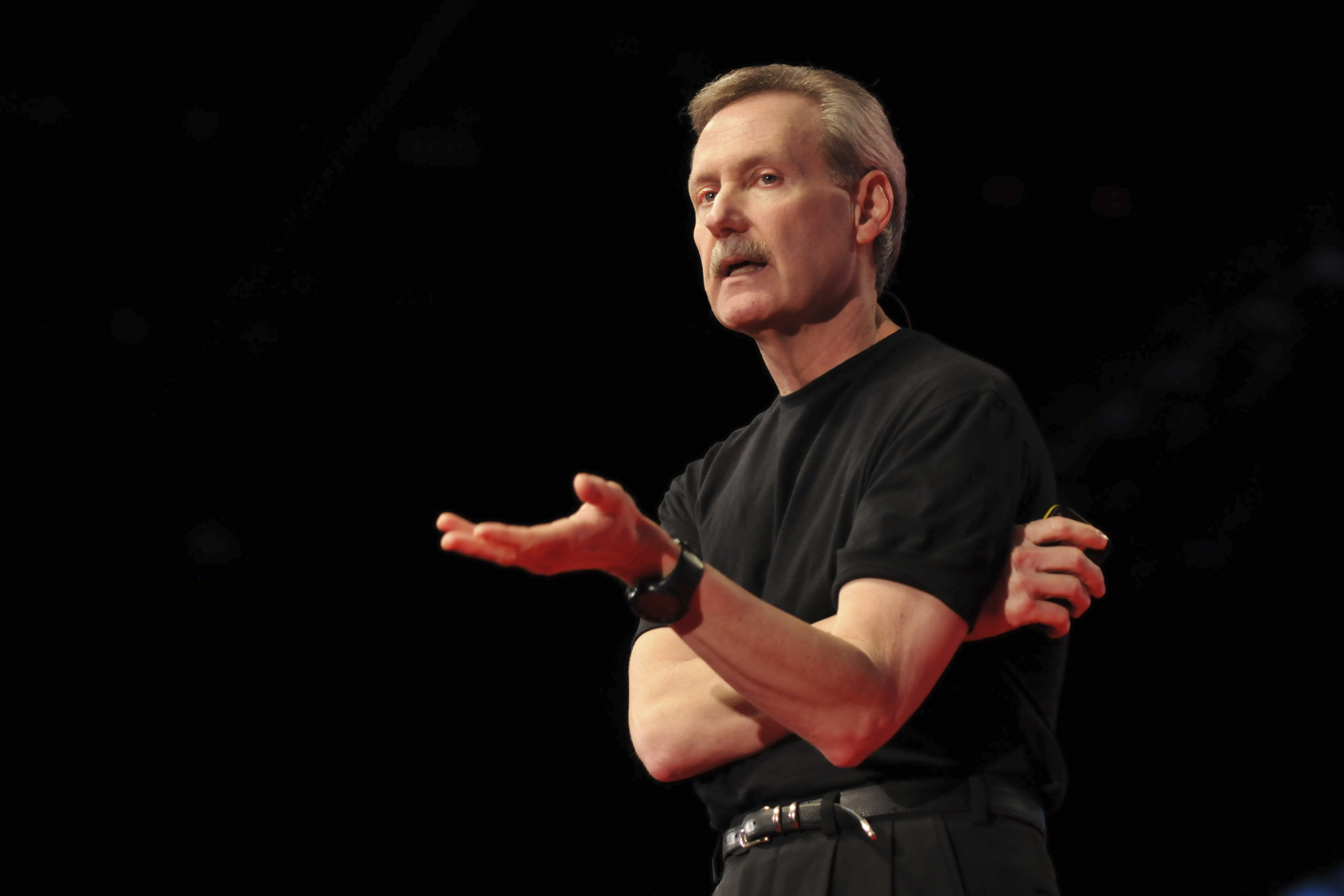
- Born: July 21, 1957 (age 69); Pasadena, Texas
- Education: Baylor University
- Occupations: Author, Real Estate Expert
- Known for: Co-founder and Executive Chairman, Keller Williams Realty
- Spouse: Mary Pfluger
- Children: John Keller
- Website: Gary Keller KW Headquarters profile

Gary Keller (born 21 July 1957) is an American entrepreneur and best-selling author. He is the founder and Executive Chairman of Keller Williams, which is the largest real estate company in the world by agent count and second in closed sales volume, and units sold. Keller founded Keller Williams on training and education and later brought his teachings to print. His books include The Millionaire Real Estate Agent, The Millionaire Real Estate Investor, and The ONE Thing. He is considered one of the most influential people in real estate.

== Early life ==
Keller was born in Pasadena, Texas. Both his mother and father were school teachers, until his father was promoted to be a high school administrator. The family moved to North Shore, outside of Houston. Keller originally had no intention of attending college. The summer following his high school graduation he began to pursue a music career. Mid-summer, he came to his parents and informed them that he wanted to go to college as his music career was not working out. His parents informed him that they had already applied to Baylor University in Waco, Texas, where he was accepted. After visiting the university, Keller decided to attend, following in the footsteps of his sister and father who had previously attended the university.

While at Baylor, Keller spent time shadowing professionals in the fields of law, accounting, banking, and real estate. It was at that time that he became interested in real estate and began to pursue a real estate and insurance degree program that had just started at the university. His senior year he was interviewed by various real estate companies who came to Baylor looking for graduates. Following graduation in 1979, Keller moved to Austin where he began his career in real estate.

== Career ==
=== Real estate ===
When Keller moved to Austin in 1979, he worked for a company that would later become a competitor. He found success in Austin, selling five houses his first month and became VP within five years. In 1983, he partnered with Joe Williams and started two companies – Keller Williams Realtors, which Keller ran, and Keller Williams Commercial, which Williams ran. The commercial company never took off, but Keller's residential side did. In 1987, inside the residential company, Keller created a division that would later become Keller Williams Realty International, which became known as KWRI.

The company grew to be the largest real estate agency in the Austin area within two years. After expansion and franchising, it became the largest real estate franchise by agent count in North America and the only privately held global residential real estate brokerage, reaching over 100,000 agents worldwide in 2014 and surpassing 180,000 agents by 2018.

In 2017, he began to transition Keller Williams into more of a technology company, launching technology initiatives that included KW Labs, KW Keller Cloud, and "Kelle," an artificial intelligence app used as a virtual assistant and an agent-to-agent referral tools platform called "Referrals." Keller replaced John Davis as CEO of the company in 2019.

=== Writing and publishing ===
Keller began writing during his early years at Keller Williams Realty. He established KellerINK for the publishing of instructional and inspirational business books with a specialty in real estate. His first book, The Millionaire Real Estate Agent, was co-authored with Dave Jenks and Jay Papasan and released in 2004. The book made the best-seller list on BusinessWeek. He co-authored a second book, The Millionaire Real Estate Investor, in 2005 along with Papasan and Jenks. This book became a New York Times best-seller.

In 2013, Keller and co-author Papasan published their first non-real estate book, The ONE Thing: The Surprisingly Simple Truth Behind Extraordinary Results. The book reached #1 on the Wall Street Journal business bestseller list. It was also a bestseller on The New York Times and USA Today bestseller lists. Hudson Booksellers named The ONE Thing one of the five best business interest books of 2013. The authors have been featured in publications including Forbes and Dave Ramsey’s EntreLeadership Review. In all, Keller has published four best-selling books on real estate and has sold more than a million copies worldwide.

In addition to writing and real estate, Keller has been involved in other ventures including that of an investor. He has invested in companies such as the Austin-based Music & Entertainment Television. Keller is also a public speaker and was a panelist for the nonprofit Relationship & Information Series for Entrepreneurs in 2013 along with former Texas Longhorns quarterback Vince Young.

=== Other ventures ===
In 2013, Keller launched ALL ATX, a nonprofit with a goal to educate musicians on how to build successful careers in the Austin music industry. He purchased Saxon Pub in 2016 and One World Theatre in Austin in 2022.

=== Bibliography ===
Publication year	Title	Original publisher	ISBN	Notes
2004	The Millionaire Real Estate Agent	McGraw Hill	ISBN 9780071502085	Co-Authors Dave Jenks & Jay Papasan. BusinessWeek best-seller.
2005	The Millionaire Real Estate Investor	McGraw Hill	ISBN 9780071469531	Co-Authors Dave Jenks & Jay Papasan. BusinessWeek and New York Times best-seller.
2008	SHIFT: How Top Real Estate Agents Tackle Tough Times	KellerINK	ISBN 9780071605274	Co-Authors Dave Jenks & Jay Papasan. New York Times best-seller, the Wall Street Journal Business Bestseller, and the USA Today Bestseller.
2013	The ONE Thing	Bard Press	ISBN 9781848549258	Co-Author Jay Papasan. First non-real estate book for Keller. New York Times How-to Bestseller, New York Times Business Bestseller, Wall Street Journal Non-Fiction Bestseller, Wall Street Journal Business Bestseller, USA Today Bestseller, and Publishers Weekly Top 10 List. Mentioned on other national lists, including BookScan, Entertainment Weekly, LA Times, Hudson's Booksellers, Reuters, and 800CEOREAD. Winner of 12 book awards and translated into 26 languages.

== Recognition ==
Keller has received numerous awards and accolades over the years. He is a previous winner of the Ernst & Young Entrepreneur of the Year Award and a finalist for Inc. Magazine's Entrepreneur of the Year. In 2011 Baylor University honored him with a Meritorious Achievement Award and a Medal of Service for his business leadership. The same year Austin Business Journal recognized him as one of Austin's 30 Most Influential.

== Personal life ==
Keller has his own band that performs annually at Keller Williams events. Keller lives in Austin with his wife, Mary. Their son John also lives and works in Austin.

Keller teaches a business and life development course to young adults both in Austin and through his alma mater, Baylor University. He has been a supporter of Baylor since his graduation, and in 2007 he donated the funds for a residential real estate research center at the Hankamer School of Business. The Keller Center, as it was named, studies consumer behavior, marketing strategies, and management solutions.
