= Stearns Steam Carriage Company =

Defunct American motor vehicle manufacturer

- Industry: Automotive
- Predecessor: E. C. Stearns & Company
- Founded: 1901; 125 years ago
- Founder: Edward C. Stearns
- Defunct: 1903; 123 years ago
- Fate: Closed
- Headquarters: Syracuse, United States
- Key people: George M. Barnes
- Products: Automobiles

Stearns Steam Carriage Company was a manufacturer of steam automobiles in Syracuse, New York, founded by Edward C. Stearns. Stearns built electric automobiles from 1899 to 1900 and steam cars from 1901 to 1903. The company was also known as the Stearns Automobile Company in 1903.

== History ==
E. C. Stearns & Company was a manufacturer of hardware and bicycles and entered the automobile business producing an electric car from 1899 to 1900. The electric car sold in small quantities until fall 1900 when they decided to switch to steam cars and the Stearns Steam Carriage Company was formed. George M. Barnes designed the steam car based on his Barnes Steam Trap of 1899.

The Stearns was powered by a compound twin-cylinder 8-hp engine, with a chain drive and tiller steering. It was offered in several body styles, including a station wagon which was probably the first use of that style of car. The Runabout was priced at $900 (equivalent to $34,830 in 2025) while the top of the line Station Wagon was priced at $1,600, equivalent to $61,920 in 2025. By November of 1901, the Stearns Steam Carriage Company reported to have produced over 100 cars.

A Stearns participated in the 1901 500 Mile Endurance Run and received a First Class Ribbon. Stearns displayed at the Pan-American Exposition, and exhibited in the major motor shows. In 1902 a Stearns participated in the 500 Mile Boston-New York Reliability Run without any penalized stops.

Edward Stearns went into business with promoter Edward Joel Pennington and was vice-president of Pennington's Anglo-American Rapid Vehicle Company. A new incorporation called the Stearns Automobile Company became a subsidiary, but in the summer of 1903 the property of the Stearns Automobile Company was sold at a receiver's sale for $595.

== Gallery ==
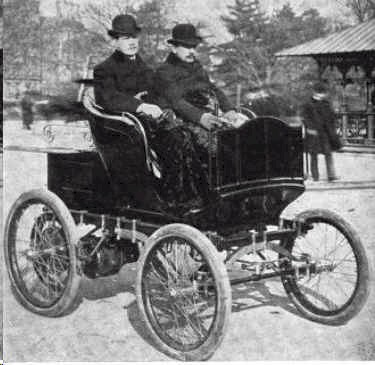
1900 Stearns Electric carriage

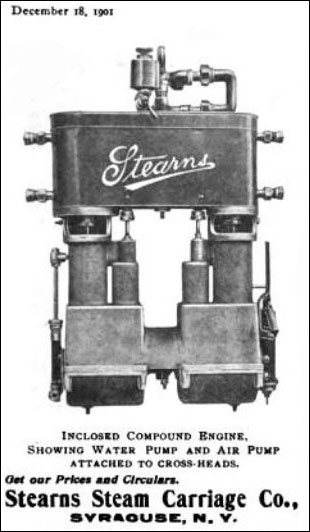
1901 Stearns Steam compound engine

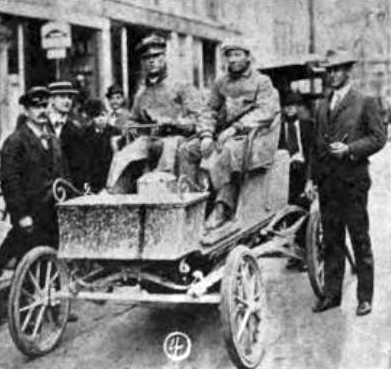
1901 Stearns runabout in Endurance Run

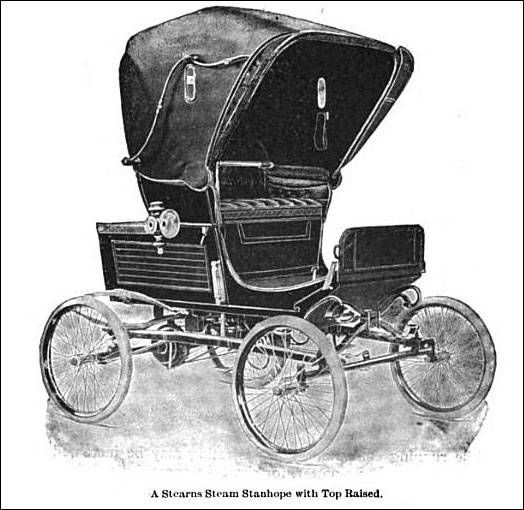
1902 Stearns Steam Stanhope with top

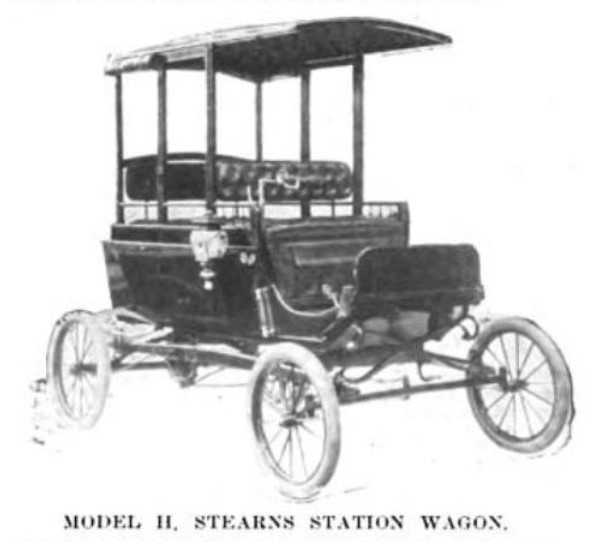
1903 Stearns Model H Station Wagon

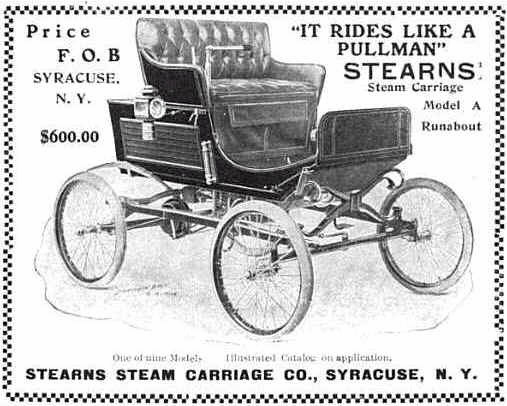
1903 Stearns Runabout advertisement
