= New York Air Brake =

- Company type: Subsidiary
- Founded: 1890
- Headquarters: Watertown, New York United States
- Products: Control Valves, Control Modules, Data Management Systems, Hose Assemblies, and various freight car components
- Revenue: $165 million USD (2005)
- Parent: Knorr-Bremse
- Website: www.nyab.com

The New York Air Brake Corporation, located in Watertown, New York, is a manufacturer of air brake and train control systems for the railroad industry worldwide.

== History ==
NYAB on its old location at Beebee Island

=== Establishment (1876-1900) ===
New York Air Brake was established on July 1, 1890 acquiring all of the property and business of Eames Vacuum Brake Company. Eames Vacuum Brake Company had previously been in existence since 1876 manufacturing vacuum brakes. The new company erected ten new buildings on Beebee Island and nearby shores just in time for a booming brake market driven by an 1893 law mandating standardized brakes for all railroad cars.

=== Expansion and a new plant (1900-1914) ===
In 1902, NYAB bought the 268-acre (1.08 km^{2}) Poole Farm in Watertown, NY, and began its move to its present location. The new Works were planned as a model industrial enterprise, providing housing, work, and recreation for 1,000 employees on the grounds. The workers, however, decided that they did not want to live next door to their workplace and the plan was scrapped. In 1903, the new foundry became the first part of the new plant to begin operations.

During this period NYAB's main competition was Westinghouse Air Brake Company, which lead the market in locomotive braking sales. Despite Westinghouse's lead, American railroads preferred to have two brake suppliers. James Hill, builder of the Great Northern Railway, and the New York Central Railroad were especially supportive of New York Air Brake's technology. In 1912, NYAB and Westinghouse agreed to share the market, along with research and development. NYAB's 25 percent share of the brake market soared to $3 million per year by 1914.

=== World War I and The Depression (1915-1940) ===
155mm shells, one of the many items produced during the WWI period

In 1915, NYAB shifted focus of their current manufacturing of vacuum brakes to efforts toward the First World War. Sales grew from $4.7 million in 1915 to $24 million in 1916. By 1918, the company employed 7,000 who were involved in defense manufacturing, including the production of horse-drawn cannons.

After World War I, it was decided that a new braking system needed to be developed to provide braking power for the ever growing freight train industry. Engineers at New York Air Brake contributed to the development of what came to be known as the "AB" brake. During the mid-1930s, at the same time the "AB" brake was being widely implemented, the pneumatic and electro-pneumatic braking equipment for modern, high-speed locomotives and passenger trains were engineered and produced at the Watertown facilities.

A dramatic drop in sales following the end of World War I led New York Air Brake to seek new markets. In 1919, the company built and marketed a "Three-Point Truck;" an "enormous affair, the four wheels alone weighing nearly one ton. The machine had a 15-foot (4.6 m) wheelbase, and an overall length of 19 feet (5.8 m). It weighed about 8,100 pounds and had a carrying capacity of from three to six tons..." It was not a success.

In 1925, new management announced another try at the auto industry with the introduction of the Gerlinger hydraulic lumber carrier; an engine, and a cab set high atop a lumber rack. The project faded quickly.

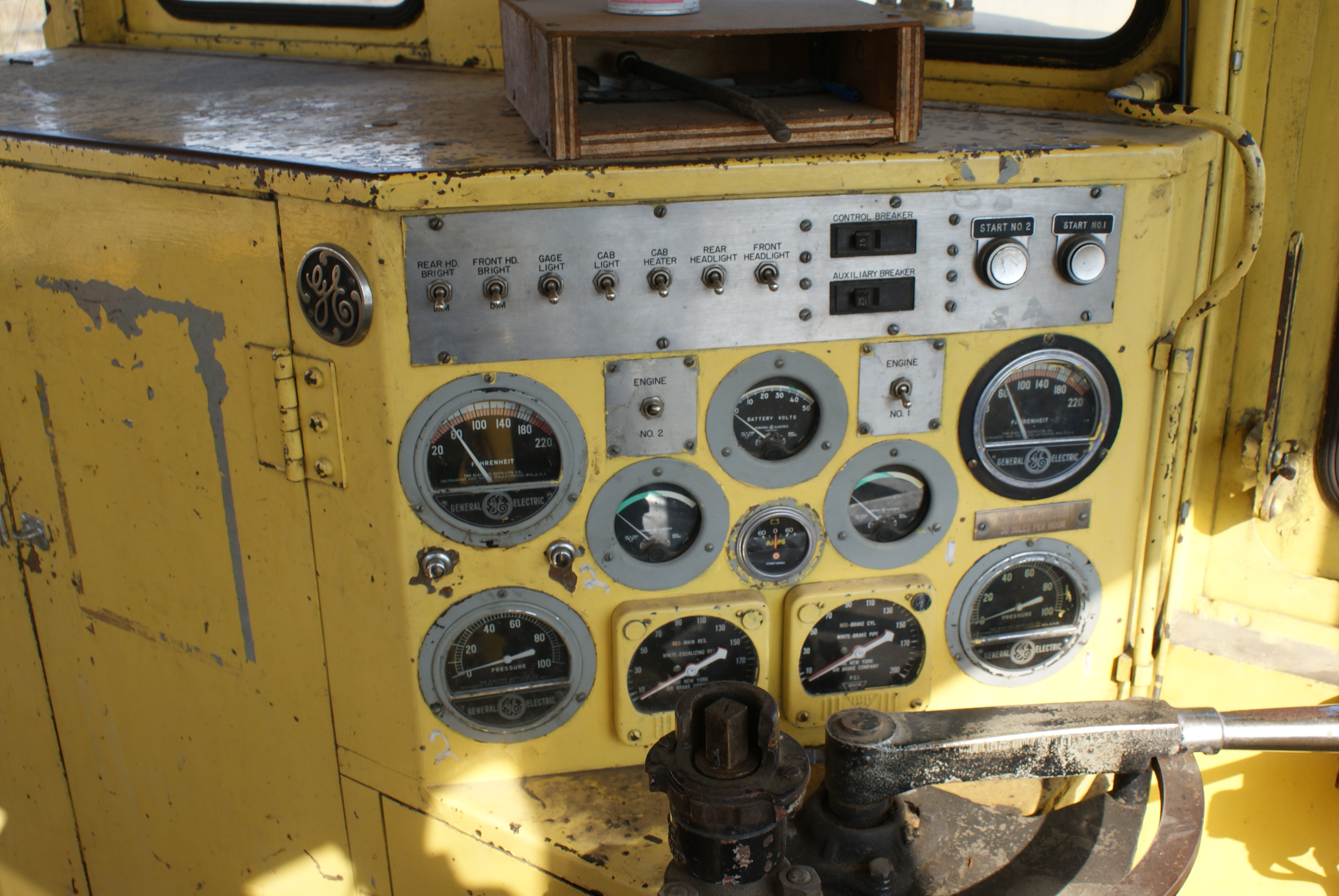
New York Air Brake gauges to control a Rotair Valve Westinghouse Air brake

Westinghouse and New York Air Brake began development of a replacement for the venerable "K Brake" in 1929. The Great Depression slowed, but did not stop, development of the new brake and, in April 1932, New York Air Brake began construction of a 200-car test track, the largest in the world. In 1934, the Association of American Railroads (AAR) voted to adopt the new composite AB brake. Despite the Depression, the company maintained employment for 300 workers, many on a part-time basis.

=== World War II (1940-1945) ===
In 1945, New York Air Brake again returned to aiding the United States' war effort in World War II. Up until the end of the war, NYAB became a producer of tank hulls for the Sherman tank, anti-aircraft shells, automatic pilots for aircraft, breech mechanisms for guns, hydraulic pumps for fighter aircraft, and other military hardware and had over 5,000 employees contributing to the war effort in the war-torn Europe by the end of 1944.

By the end of the Second World War, New York Air Brake had expanded its product line to include hydraulic aircraft pumps. In 1949, the company furthered its market reach with the purchase of the Hydraulic Equipment Company Dudco Products Company. As a result, sales leapt from $18 million in 1950 to more than $45 million in 1957.

=== General Signal and mass transit (1967-1988) ===
On June 15, 1967, NYAB merged with General Signal Corporation. In 1980, Congress passed the Staggers Act, which deregulated the railroad industry. As a result of the ending of tax breaks for railroad car ownership, new car and brake orders plummeted from 96,000 in 1979 to 5,800 in 1983. In November 1982, the company put into effect a series of workforce cutbacks that enabled NYAB to survive this difficult time.

Meantime, in 1972 New York Air Brake's lobbying in Albany, NY landed a trial run with the New York City transit system. The company was allowed to equip one eight car R44 train numbers 368-379, with one spare four car set of brakes each, making it a total of 12 cars equipped with same.. One trouble-free year later, New York Air Brake signed a $25 million contract to provide brake systems and controls for New York transit's entire fleet of 754 R46 subway cars, the beginning of over a decade of providing brakes to commuter lines. By 1990, New York Air Brake had furnished $100 million worth of equipment for more than half of New York City's R62A's, R68's and R110A/R110B subway cars before NYAB's Transit Division was established as the Knorr Brake Company and moved to Westminster, Maryland.

=== Knorr-Bremse and the modern era (1991-present) ===
On January 2, 1991, Knorr-Bremse acquired New York Air Brake's rail braking business from General Signal, however, they did not purchase Stratopower, or Dynapower.

By the end of 1993, NYAB stopped manufacturing the Westinghouse brake in favor of Knorr-Bremse's improved DB-60 air brake featuring poppet valve technology. Consolidation of operations into one building, tax abatements and state funding kept the company in Watertown.

Since its acquisition, NYAB has modernized under Knorr-Bremse creating the most technologically advanced rail brake manufacturing facility in North America.

At the end of 2009, NYAB operations included Train Dynamic Systems (TDS) in Irving, Texas, Knorr Brake Limited in Kingston, Ontario, a brake shoe manufacturer, a brake hose manufacturer, and two Service Centers in Little Rock, Arkansas and Riverside (Kansas City) Missouri.

== Products ==
- DB60 - Pneumatic control valve
- CCB II - (Computer Controlled Brake)
- EP60 - Electronically controlled pneumatic brakes (ECP)
- LEADER - (Locomotive Engineer Assist/Display & Event Recorder) is an on-board computer/display and off-board data management system designed to improve train handling and save fuel.
- Air Hose Products
- Freight Car Components
- EL-60/ELRP - Protects wheels by reducing braking forces on empty cars
- TMB60 - Parallelogram locomotive brake design
- CSCTD - (Computerized Single Car Test Device) is a portable air brake test system
- TDS-5000 - Operations and training simulation and analysis system

== See also ==
- Eames Vacuum Brake
- Iron Highway
- Vacuum brake
