= Twice in a Lifetime =

Twice in a Lifetime may refer to:

- Twice in a Lifetime (TV series), a Canadian mystery/drama series
- Twice in a Lifetime (film), a 1985 film starring Gene Hackman
- Twice in a Lifetime (1974 film), a TV film starring Ernest Borgnine
- "Twice in a Lifetime", a song by Paul McCartney from The Paul McCartney Collection
- "Twice Inna Lifetime", a song by Black Star from Mos Def & Talib Kweli Are Black Star

== See also ==
- Once in a Lifetime (disambiguation)
