= Once More =

Once More may refer to:

== Film ==
- Once More (1988 film), a French drama film
- Once More (1997 film), an Indian Tamil-language film starring Vijay and Sivaji Ganesan
- Once More (2012 film), or The Magic of Belle Isle, an American comedy-drama film
- Once More (2026 film), an Indian Tamil-language film starring Arjun Das and Aditi Shankar

== Literature ==
- Once More* with Footnotes, a 2004 book by Terry Pratchett
- Zarathustra's roundelay, or Once More, an 1883 poem by Friedrich Nietzsche

== Music ==
=== Albums ===
- Once More (Billy Higgins album), 1980
- Once More (Colonial Cousins album), 2012
- Once More (Porter Wagoner and Dolly Parton album) or the title song, 1970
- Once More (Spandau Ballet album), 2009
- Once More! Charlie Byrd's Bossa Nova, by Charlie Byrd, 1963
- Once More (EP), by Xaviersobased, 2025
- Once More (soundtrack), of the 2026 film

=== Songs ===
- "Once More" (The Orb song), 2001
- "Once More" (Spandau Ballet song), 2009
- "Once More", a song by Roy Acuff, 1958
- "Once More" (In CoF Minor), a remix by Mikhail Karikis of Bjork's "Army of Me" from Army of Me: Remixes and Covers, 2005
- "Once More" a song by D4vd from his 2023 EP, The Lost Petals
- "Once More", a 1986 single by The Wedding Present included on the compilation album Tommy

== See also ==
- One More (disambiguation)
- Once Again
