= The One Thing (book) =

2013 self-help book by Gary W. Keller and Jay Papasan

The One Thing: The Surprisingly Simple Truth Behind Extraordinary Results
- Author: Gary W. Keller; Jay Papasan
- Genre: Non-fiction; Self-help
- Publisher: Bard Press
- Publication date: April 1, 2013
- Publication place: United States
- Pages: 240
- ISBN: 978-1885167774
- Website: www.the1thing.com

The One Thing: The Surprisingly Simple Truth Behind Extraordinary Results (stylized The ONE Thing) is a non-fiction self-help book written by authors and real estate entrepreneurs Gary W. Keller and Jay Papasan. The book discusses the value of simplifying one's workload by focusing on the one most important task in any given project. The book has appeared on the bestseller lists of The New York Times, The Wall Street Journal, USA Today, and Amazon.com. It was first published by Bard Press on April 1, 2013.

== Background ==
Gary Keller is the co-founder and chairman of the board at Keller Williams Realty, which is one of the world's largest real estate companies. Jay Papasan is the Vice President of publishing at Keller Williams. Prior to the publication of The One Thing in 2013, the two collaborated on The Millionaire Real Estate series of books which discussed how to invest in and earn money from real estate properties. The One Thing is the duo's first book that is not specifically focused on real estate. Instead, it discusses the general business principle of choosing a single task to work on to theoretically maximize the efficiency of that task and the overall project.

== Summary ==
The book discusses the benefits of prioritizing a single task, and it also provides examples of how to engage in those tasks with a singular focus. The book begins with a section entitled, "The Lies: They Mislead and Derail Us", which analyzes the ways in which multitasking has erroneously been praised as a desirable trait. The authors also challenge the concept of "work-life balance", calling it "[i]dealistic, but not realistic." They concluded this section by quoting that “Success isn’t a game won by whoever does the most” and believe that the majority of what we want will come from the minority of what we do.

This then leads to the "Focusing Question" which asks "What's the ONE Thing I can do such that by doing it everything else will be easier or unnecessary?" This second section of the book deals with productivity principles like habit-building and benchmarking. For instance, the book suggests that readers should engage in four hours of work on their "ONE thing" each day. The authors cite economist Vilfredo Pareto as one of the inspirations behind this philosophy. Pareto's principle suggested that 20 percent of the effort produces 80 percent of the results. According to the book, this means that engaging in the one most important task will be more likely to produce the desired results without any extraneous effort. The book also differentiates between the Big-Picture Question ("What's my ONE Thing?") and the Small-Focus Question ("What's my ONE Thing right now?"). The core idea is that focusing on an excessive amount of tasks will more likely lead to discord and under-performance.

The third section of the book discusses "Extraordinary Results", which details how to make the above principles actionable. One of the concepts it illustrates is "time blocking", which means that one should focus on only their one thing during a given amount of time. It also suggests that readers should schedule time to reflect, plan, and even relax. Everything else during scheduled time blocks is characterized as a distraction. Each section of the book is followed up by a "Big Ideas" review that gives a summary of the sections' concepts and principles.

== Critical reception ==
The One Thing garnered success both critically and commercially. It was listed as a best seller by The New York Times, The Wall Street Journal, USA Today, and Amazon.com. Hudson Booksellers listed it among their best "Business Interest" books of 2013. In an article for Entrepreneur, Brandon Turner named The One Thing one of the "5 Powerful Books That Changed the Direction of My Life". In a review for The National, Alice Haine notes that the book "has the necessary ingredients to boost those feeling a little overwhelmed by the pressures of work and home life." Publishers Weekly noted that book had "an appealing style and energy." It has won a total of 12 book awards and been translated into 26 languages. It was also voted one of the Top 100 Business Books of All Time on Goodreads.
