= Once in a Blue Moon =

Once in a Blue Moon may refer to:

== Film and television ==
- Once in a Blue Moon (1935 film), an American film directed by Ben Hecht
- Once in a Blue Moon (1995 film), a Canadian children's adventure film
- Once in a Blue Moon (2011 film) or A Ghost of a Chance, a Japanese film directed by Kōki Mitani
- Once in a Blue Moon: A Celebration of Australian Musicals, a 1994 Australian television special
- "Once in a Blue Moon" (Charmed), a television episode

== Literature ==
- Once in a Blue Moon (comics), a 2004 graphic novel by Nunzio DeFilippis and Christina Weir
- Once in a Blue Moon (stories), a 2003 story collection, included in the 2010 collection Screwtop Thompson, by Magnus Mills

== Music ==
=== Albums ===
- Once in a Blue Moon (Fool's Garden album) or the title song, 1993
- Once in a Blue Moon (Frankie Miller album), 1973
- Once in a Blue Moon (Phil Beer Band album), 2001
- Once in a Blue Moon (University of Texas Jazz Orchestra album) or the title song, 2000
- Once in a Blue Moon: A Celebration of Australian Musicals, a soundtrack album from the 1994 Australian television special
- Once in a Blue Moon, by Mabel Mercer, 1958

=== Songs ===
- "Once in a Blue Moon" (song), by Earl Thomas Conley, 1986
- "Once in a Blue Moon", by Lighthouse Family from the album Postcards from Heaven, 1997
- "Once in a Blue Moon", by Sydney Forest from the soundtrack album Simply Irresistible, 1999
- "Once in a Blue Moon", from the musical Summer Rain, 1983
- "Once in a Blue Moon", by Van Morrison from the album What's Wrong with This Picture?, 2003

== See also ==
- Once in a Very Blue Moon, a 1984 album by Nanci Griffith, or its title song
- Blue moon, a lunar event erroneously assumed to have given rise to the expression
- Once Upon a Blue Moon: Science Fiction Stories, a 2006 sci-fi short story collection by Indian writer Sukanya Datta
- Once in a Lifetime (disambiguation)
