= Just (given name) =

Just is a masculine given name. It may refer to:

- Just Fontaine (1933–2023), French retired footballer
- Just Høg (1584–1646), Danish politician, landowner and Chancellor of the Realm
- Just Jaeckin (1940–2022), French film director
- Just Spee (born 1965), Dutch football administrator
