= One More Thing (Lime Garden album) =

Studio album by Lime Garden
- Released: 16 February 2024
- Length: 30:06
- Label: So Young
- Producer: Ali Chant

Lime Garden chronology
| Pop Star (2024) | One More Thing (2024) | Maybe Not Tonight (2026) |

Singles from One More Thing
- 1. "Nepotism (Baby)" Released: 17 July 2023; 2. "Love Song" Released: 13 September 2023; 3. "I Want to Be You" Released: 15 November 2023; 4. "Mother" Released: 17 January 2024; 5. "Pop Star" Released: 14 February 2024

One More Thing is the debut studio album by British indie rock band Lime Garden, released on 16 February 2024 through So Young Records. It was produced by Ali Chant, and preceded by five singles: "Nepotism (Baby)", "Love Song", "I Want to Be You", "Mother" and "Pop Star" and received acclaim from critics.

== Critical reception ==
Professional ratings
Aggregate scores
| Source | Rating |
|---|---|
| Metacritic | 80/100 |
Review scores
| Source | Rating |
| DIY | 4.5/5 stars |
| Mojo | 4/5 stars |
| NME | 4/5 stars |
| The Skinny | 3/5 stars |

One More Thing received a score of 80 out of 100 on review aggregator Metacritic based on five critics' reviews, indicating "universal acclaim". Mojo felt that "allied to keening, reedy vocals and sophisticated hooks, these songs deliver a truly impressive debut". DIY's Elvis Thirlwell called it "an intimately touching listen, with each of vocalist Chloe Howard's words confessed as if over a cup of tea on a kitchen table" and felt that it "confirms Lime Garden as a band with potential to achieve even higher artistic greatness".

Tara Hepburn of The Skinny found it to be "full of wry lyrics and interesting sonic choices" and remarked that "some of these musical experiments work better than others", concluding that "as far as debut albums go, this is a promising one". NME's Tilly Foulkes summarised: "[lucking sounds and aesthetics from both late '00s indie sleaze and contemporary alt-pop, this stellar record – which takes its name from a short story by Raymond Carver – is nothing short of electric". Jon M. Gilbertson of The Shepherd Express wrote that "the band doesn't make itself ostentatiously present the way those Britpop groups did", calling it "that rare first LP that can make a listener crave Beatlesian profligacy from a band. It's inviting, not invasive."

== Track listing ==
One More Thing track listing
| No. | Title | Length |
|---|---|---|
| 1. | "Love Song" | 3:11 |
| 2. | "Mother" | 2:47 |
| 3. | "Nepotism (Baby)" | 2:40 |
| 4. | "Pop Star" | 2:54 |
| 5. | "Pine" | 4:12 |
| 6. | "I Want to Be You" | 2:33 |
| 7. | "Floor" | 2:10 |
| 8. | "Fears" | 2:44 |
| 9. | "It" | 4:24 |
| 10. | "Looking" | 2:31 |
| Total length: | | 30:06 |

== Personnel ==
Lime Garden

- Chloe Howard – vocals, guitar
- Annabel Whittle – drums
- Leila Deeley – guitar
- Tippi Morgan – bass guitar

== Charts ==
Chart performance for One More Thing
| Chart (2024) | Peak position |
|---|---|
| Scottish Albums (Official Charts) | 50 |
| UK Independent Albums (Official Charts) | 11 |
