= Charles F. Dowd =

Charles F. Dowd (1825–1904) was an American educator who was co-principal (with his wife Harriet M. Dowd) of the Temple Grove Ladies Seminary (now Skidmore College) in Saratoga Springs, New York. He was the first person to propose multiple time zones for any country, those for the railways of the United States. He did not propose their extension to the entire world, which was suggested by the Italian mathematician Quirico Filopanti, and championed by the Canadian engineer Sandford Fleming.

== Biography ==
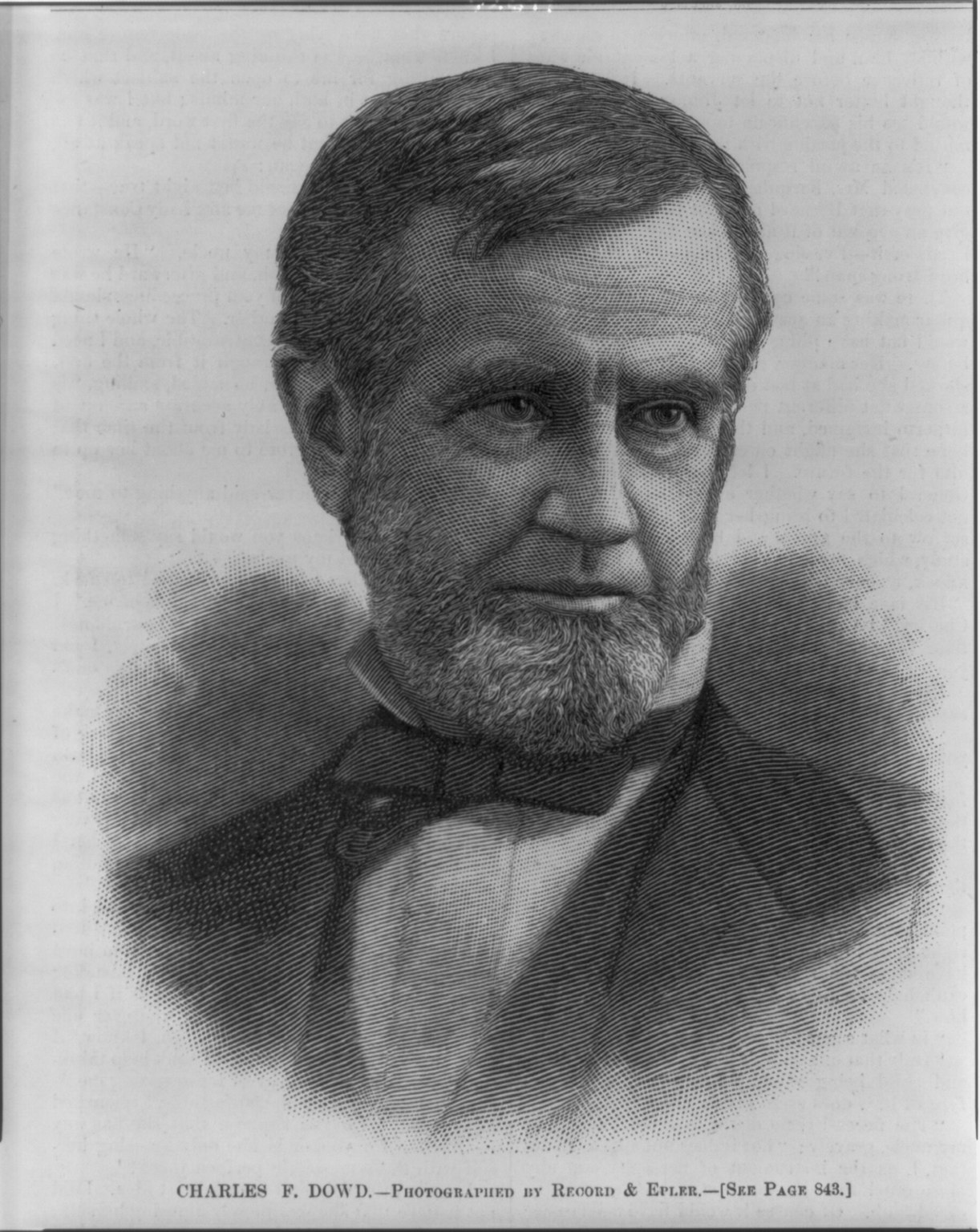
Charles F. Dowd

About 1863, he first proposed time zones for United States railways to teenage girls whom he was teaching. In 1869, he presented his idea to a committee of railway superintendents in New York. As a result, in 1870 he published a pamphlet entitled "A System of National Time for Railroads" wherein he proposed four time zones, each 15° wide, the time of each being one hour different from the next, named Washington, first, second, and third hours. The central meridian of the first zone was the Washington meridian. The borders of all zones were lines of longitude. In 1872, he modified his proposal so that the first zone was centered on the 75th meridian west of Greenwich, with the others 90°, 105°, and 120° west of Greenwich. Now all had geographic borders, such as the Appalachian Mountains for a portion of the border between the first and second zones.

Except for meridians based on Greenwich, the system adopted by the railroad industry on 18 November 1883 ignored Dowd's proposal. The adopted system by William F. Allen, editor of the Traveler's Official Railway Guide, had borders that passed through railway terminals, even some in major cities, like Detroit, Buffalo, Pittsburgh, Atlanta, and Charleston—these formed the border between the eastern and central time zones. It included a fifth time zone for eastern Canada, called Intercolonial Time after the Intercolonial Railway serving eastern Canada. Each of these boundary cities had to adopt one of the two railroad zones or continue to use local mean solar time. The 1918 Standard Time Act moved the borders to relatively rural areas.

Dowd died underneath the wheels of a locomotive in Saratoga, New York, in 1904.
