= Just One (album) =

Studio album by Better Than a Thousand
- Released: July 1997
- Genre: Hardcore punk
- Label: Revelation Records

Better Than a Thousand chronology
Just One (1997)	Value Driven (1999)

Just One is the debut album by the hardcore band Better Than a Thousand, released in 1997. Originally just intended to be a fun project, Ray Cappo, Graham Land and Ken Olden recorded some hardcore songs at Issa Diao's (of Good Clean Fun) studio in Atlanta. After releasing this album, the band gained a large following. This was mainly because Better Than a Thousand's sound reminds a lot of people of Ray's old band Youth of Today, only then slightly updated to the melodic hardcore style that was famous around 1997.

== Track listing ==
1. "Live Today" - 2:28
2. "It Never Rains" - 1:58
3. "Just One" - 1:46
4. "Motivation" - 1:22
5. "We Spoke Our Minds" - 2:34
6. "Nightclub" - 2:04
7. "You Were The One" - 2:15
8. "Alternative Nation" - 1:52
9. "When Seasons Change" - 2:24
10. "Is It Education...?" - 1:42
11. "Apology" - 2:40
12. "Sunshine" - 1:15

== Credits ==
- Ray Cappo - vocals
- Ken Olden - drums
- Graham Land - guitar
- Jeff Neumann - bass
- Issa Diao - engineer
- Tom Bejgrowicz - artwork
