= Baby One More Time (disambiguation) =

"...Baby One More Time" is a 1998 song by Britney Spears.

Baby One More Time may also refer to:

- ...Baby One More Time (album), the 1999 debut album by Britney Spears
- ...Baby One More Time Tour, a 1999 North American tour by Britney Spears

== See also ==
- Hit Me, Baby, One More Time (TV series), a 2005 television entertainment show
