= One Time =

One Time may refer to:

- "One Time" (AKA song), 2017
- "One Time" (Cherish song), 2017
- "One Time" (Justin Bieber song), 2009
- "One Time" (Migos song), 2015
- "One Time" (Nav and Don Toliver song), 2022
- "One Time", a song by Moka Only from The Desired Effect, 2005; and Desired Effect, 2006
- "One Time", a song by King Crimson from their album Thrak, also appearing in their album/DVD Eyes Wide Open
- "Rocket Sneaker/One x Time", a song by Japanese artist Ai Otsuka
- 1time, a South African airline
- One timer, an ice hockey shot
- One time, one times, one-time, etc., an American (commonly found in hip hop music) slang term for police officers
