= Edward C. Stearns =

Edward Carl Stearns
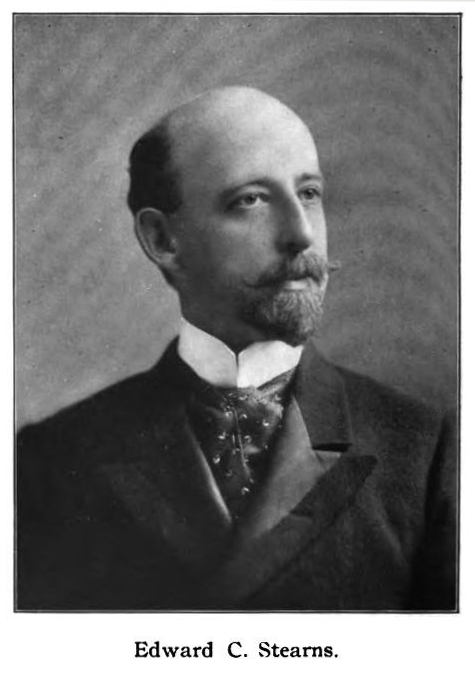
- Born: July 12, 1856; Syracuse, New York
- Died: April 21, 1929 (aged 72); Syracuse, New York
- Citizenship: United States
- Occupation(s): Entrepreneur and industrialist
- Known for: Founder of E. C. Stearns & Co., Stearns Automobile Co., Stearns Steam Carriage Co., Stearns Typewriter Co., and E. C. Stearns Bicycle Agency
- Height: 5 ft 6 in (168 cm)
- Spouse: Louisa Albro
- Children: One adopted son, John Edward Stearns
- Parent(s): George Noble Stearns (1812–1882) and Delilah Amanda Taylor (born 1816)

Edward Carl Stearns (July 12, 1856 – April 21, 1929) was an American entrepreneur and industrialist. He was the founder of several companies in the late 19th century in Syracuse, New York, including E. C. Stearns & Company, Stearns Automobile Company, Stearns Steam Carriage Company, Stearns Typewriter Company, and E. C. Stearns Bicycle Agency.
