= Just (surname) =

Just is a surname. Notable people with the surname include:

- Alexander Just (1874-1937), German/Hungarian chemist and inventor
- Carl Just (1897-1990), Norwegian journalist
- Cassià Maria Just (1926-2008), Catalan abbot
- Elijah Just (born 2000), New Zealand footballer
- Ernest Everett Just (1883-1941), American biologist
- Florian Just (born 1982), German pairs skater
- Gabriele Just (born 1936), German chess player
- Gustav Just (1921-2011), East-German writer and editor
- Helen Just, British cellist (flourished 1920s-1960s)
- Jesper Just (born 1974), Danish artist
- Joe Just (1916-2003), American baseball player
- Johann August Just (c.1750-1791), German composer active in the Netherlands
- John Just (1797-1852), English archaeologist and botanist
- John Augustus Just (1854-1908), German-born American chemist and inventor
- Karsten Just (born 1968), East-German sprinter
- Klaus Just (born 1964), West-German sprinter
- Marcel Just, American psychologist and cognitive neuroscientist
- Myron Just (born 1941), American politician and farmer from North Dakota
- Paul Just (born 1964), German-born Canadian pole vaulter
- Theodore Just (1886-1937), British athlete
- Ward Just (1935-2019), American writer
