= E. C. Stearns Bicycle Agency =

1890s American bicycle manufacturer

- Type: Bicycle Manufacturing
- Industry: Bicycle production
- Genre: Bicycles
- Founded: 1893; 133 years ago
- Founder: Edward Carl Stearns
- Defunct: 1899; 127 years ago
- Fate: Merged with the American Bicycle Company of Chicago
- Headquarters: Syracuse, New York, United States
- Area served: United States
- Key people: Herbert E. Maslin
- Products: Yellow Fellow
- Number of employees: 2,000
- Parent: E. C. Stearns & Company

E. C. Stearns Bicycle Agency was established in 1893 by industrialist Edward C. Stearns, who began business as a hardware manufacturer and branched out into bicycle production from 1893 through 1899.

All Stearns bicycles were called "Yellow Fellows" because of their yellow-orange color. They were manufactured at Stearns' plants in Syracuse, New York.

== Advertisements ==
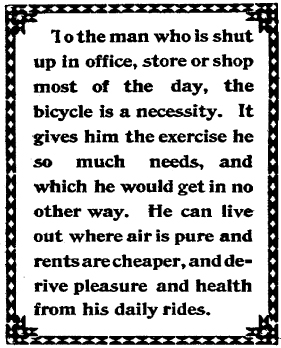
E. C. Stearns & Company - Advertisement - April 1893

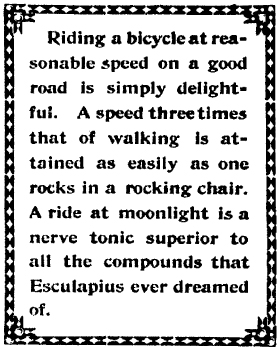
E. C. Stearns & Company - Advertisement - April 1893

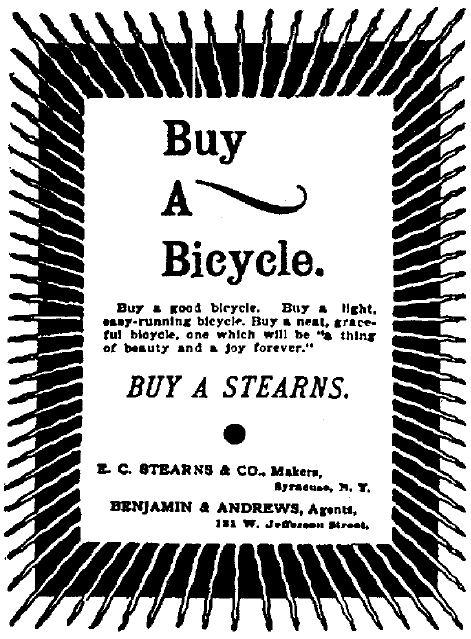
Buy a Bicycle, Buy a Stearns - Benjamin & Andrews, agents at 121 West Jefferson Street in Syracuse, New York 1895

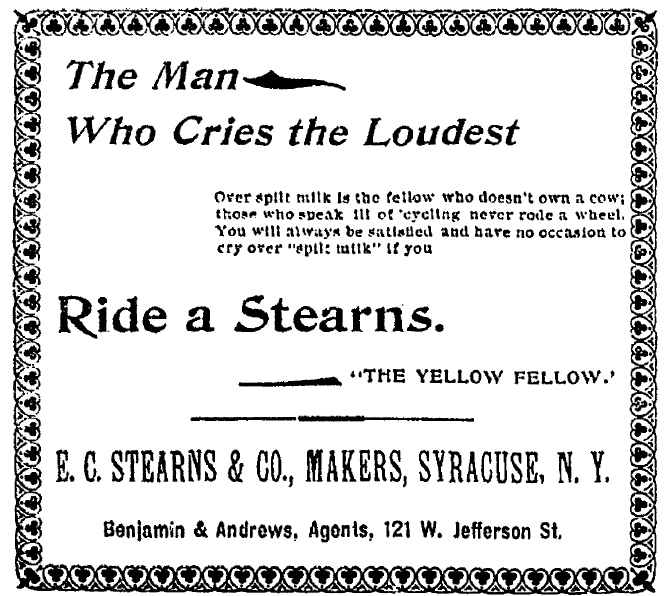
Stearns Bicycle - Syracuse Evening Herald - April 1895

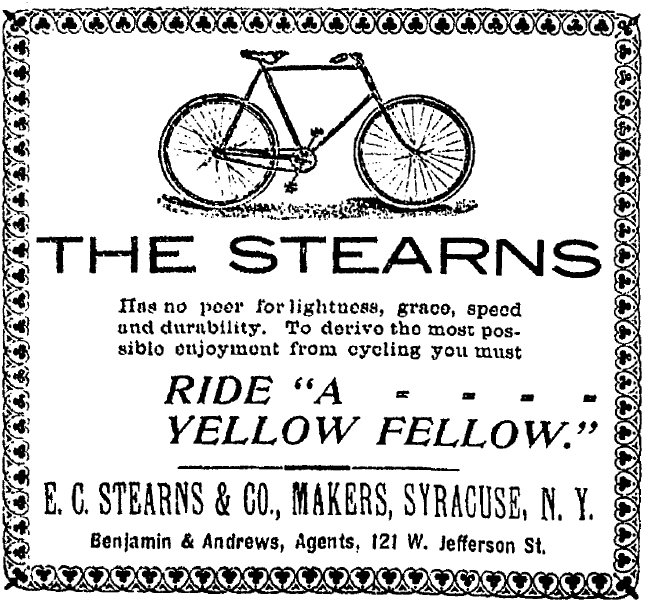
Stearns Bicycle - Advertisement - April 1895

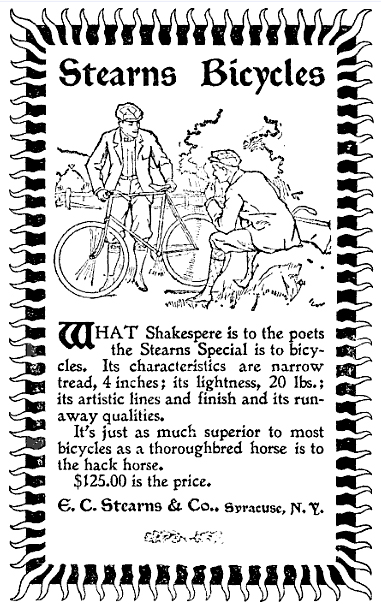
Stearns Bicycle - Advertisement - The Philistine, December 1896

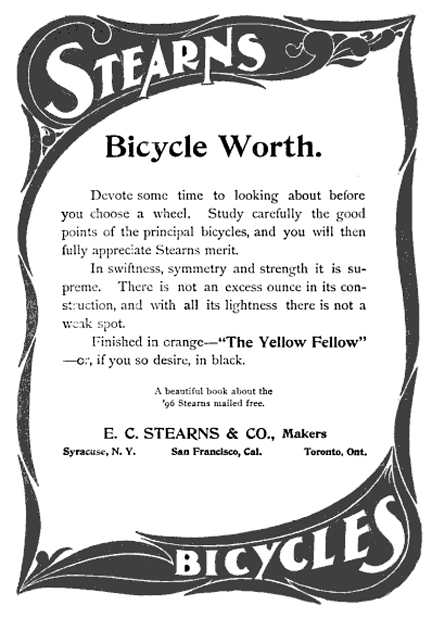
Stearns Bicycle - White Flyer in either white or black - 1896

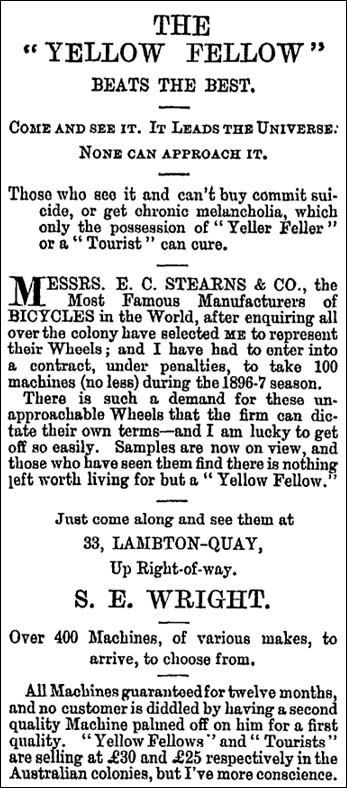
Stearns Bicycle - Advertisement - New Zealand Evening Post, 1896

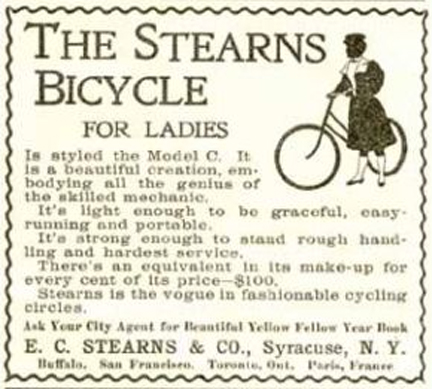
Stearns Bicycle - Advertisement - For Ladies - 1897

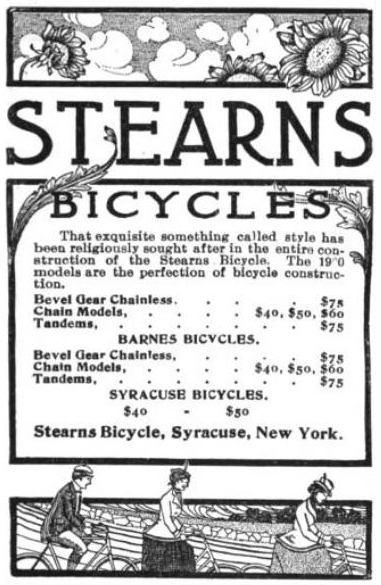
Stearns Bicycle - Advertisement, Good Roads, June 1900

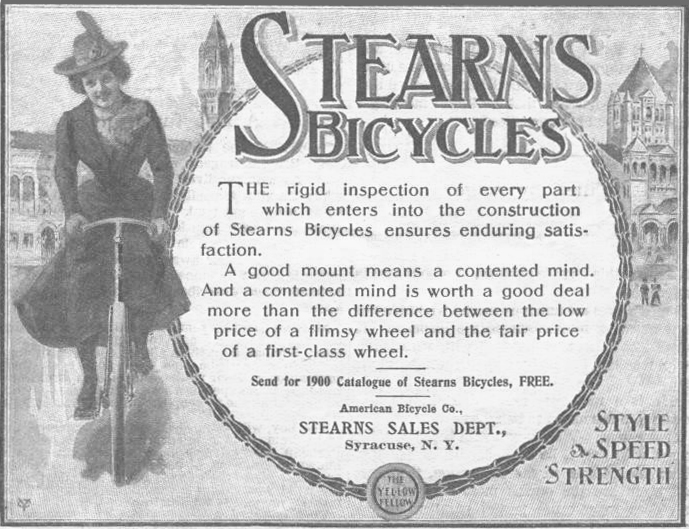
Stearns Bicycle - Advertisement - 1900

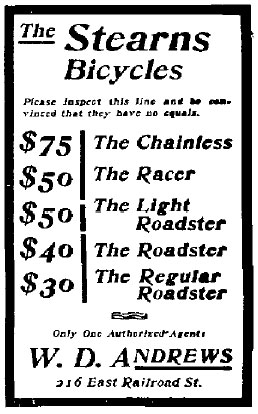
Stearns Bicycle - Advertisement - Syracuse Post-Standard, June 5, 1901
