= Once =

Once may refer to:

== Film, television and theatre ==
- Once (film), a 2007 Irish musical film by John Carney
  - Once (musical), a 2011 stage adaptation of the film
- Once (TV series), a 2017–2019 Argentine telenovela
- Once, an upcoming Chilean period drama film by Pablo Larraín about the 1973 Chilean coup d'état

== Television channels ==
- Canal Once (Mexico), a Mexican public television network
  - Once Niñas y Niños, a Mexican children's television network
- ELONCE, a television station in Paraná, Entre Rios, Argentina

== Music ==
=== Performers ===
- The Once, a Canadian folk trio
- Once Mekel (born 1970), Indonesian singer
- Once, fans of the South Korean girl group Twice

=== Albums ===
- Once (Nightwish album), 2004
- Once (Roy Harper album), 1990
- Once (The Tyde album), 2001
- Once (soundtrack), from the 2007 film
- Once (EP), by Peggy Gou, 2018

=== Songs ===
- "Once" (Diana Vickers song), 2010
- "Once" (Pearl Jam song), 1991
- "Once", by Liam Gallagher from Why Me? Why Not., 2019
- "Once", by Rascal Flatts from Unstoppable, 2009
- "Once", by Shane Filan from You and Me, 2013
- "Once", by Van Halen from Van Halen III, 1998

== Organizations ==
- ONCE, the Spanish National Organization of the Blind
  - ONCE cycling team, a Spanish cycling team 1989–2006
- ONCE Group, an artists' collective that sponsored a music festival in Ann Arbor, Michigan, 1961–1966

== Other uses ==
- Once (adverb), multiplicative indicating 'one time'
- Once (novel), a 2005 children's novel by Morris Gleitzman
- Once, a section of Balvanera, a neighbourhood in Buenos Aires, Argentina
  - Once railway station
  - Once - 30 de Diciembre (Buenos Aires Underground)
- El Once, an alternate name for the 1973 Chilean coup d'état
