= John Augustus Just =

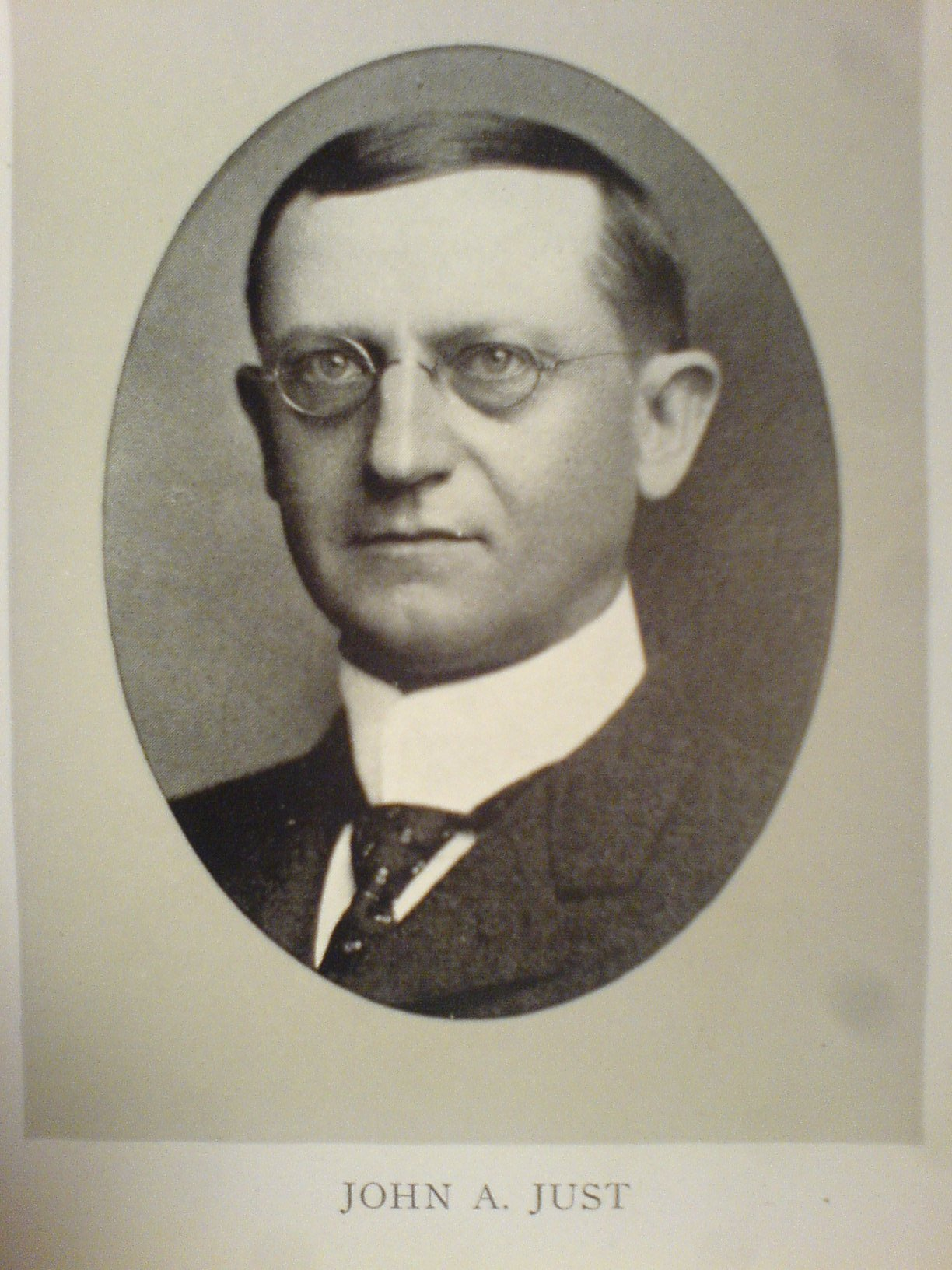
Dr. John Augustus Just

Dr. John Augustus Just (January 9, 1854 – September 13, 1908) was a German-born chemist and inventor. He is best known for his investigative work into recovery of precious metals from their ores and for completing the process for evaporating milk. For his scientific achievements, he was awarded a medal by the committee celebrating Berthelot's 50th anniversary.

Just registered dozens of patents with the United States Patent Office. He also founded several companies in the Syracuse, New York area including the Just Mining and Extraction Company, the Just's Food Company, the Just Process Company and the Just Reduction Company. He belonged to numerous scientific societies, and his work in investigative chemistry gained him worldwide recognition.

== Early life and education ==
John Augustus Just claimed to have been born in Karlsbad, Germany; United States census records, however, indicate that he was born in the small town of Feilbingert in the state of Rhineland-Palatinate, Germany. He was one of five children. Their parents were Christian and Julia (Steel) Just; Christian was a merchant, interested in coal-mining.

Little is known about Just's early years; William Martin Beauchamp wrote that "John A. Just from early boyhood days manifested the strong mentality and love of scientific research which have gained him eminence as a chemist". He attended German public schools, Bonn University, the technology school at Zurich and Heidelberg University (from which he graduated as Doctor of Science at age 18).

Immediately after graduation Just emigrated to New York following the war between Germany and France, leaving Antwerp in the spring of 1874 and arriving in New York shortly afterwards. Upon his arrival he lived in New York City for 13 years, working as a chemist for a large corporation. He continued to study chemistry at the Astor Library.

== Marriage and family ==
In 1886 Just moved to Syracuse, where he lived for the remainder of his life. He married Annie Laurie (Baughman) Just; however, the year and place of the marriage is unknown. He had a son, Morton C. Just, with a Canadian woman whose identity is unknown. Just and Annie had three children: John H., Mary H. and Alvah L.

In June 1902, Dr. Just purchased two building lots in Selkirk Beach (on the shore of Lake Ontario – not to be confused with the Selkirk near Albany) from Edmund Brown to build a summer cottage. No construction was done, and the lots were sold a short time later to Edwin M. Gallup of Syracuse. Just purchased the Tollner mansion in Pulaski, New York in April 1903. In August 1905, Just purchased the Bartels residence in Syracuse, taking possession after returning from a trip to Europe in November of that year and transferring ownership of the Tollner mansion to Mr. Bartels. At this time, his new house in Syracuse was valued at $40,000 and was viewed as one of the finest pieces of property on West Genesee Street.

== Syracuse businesses ==
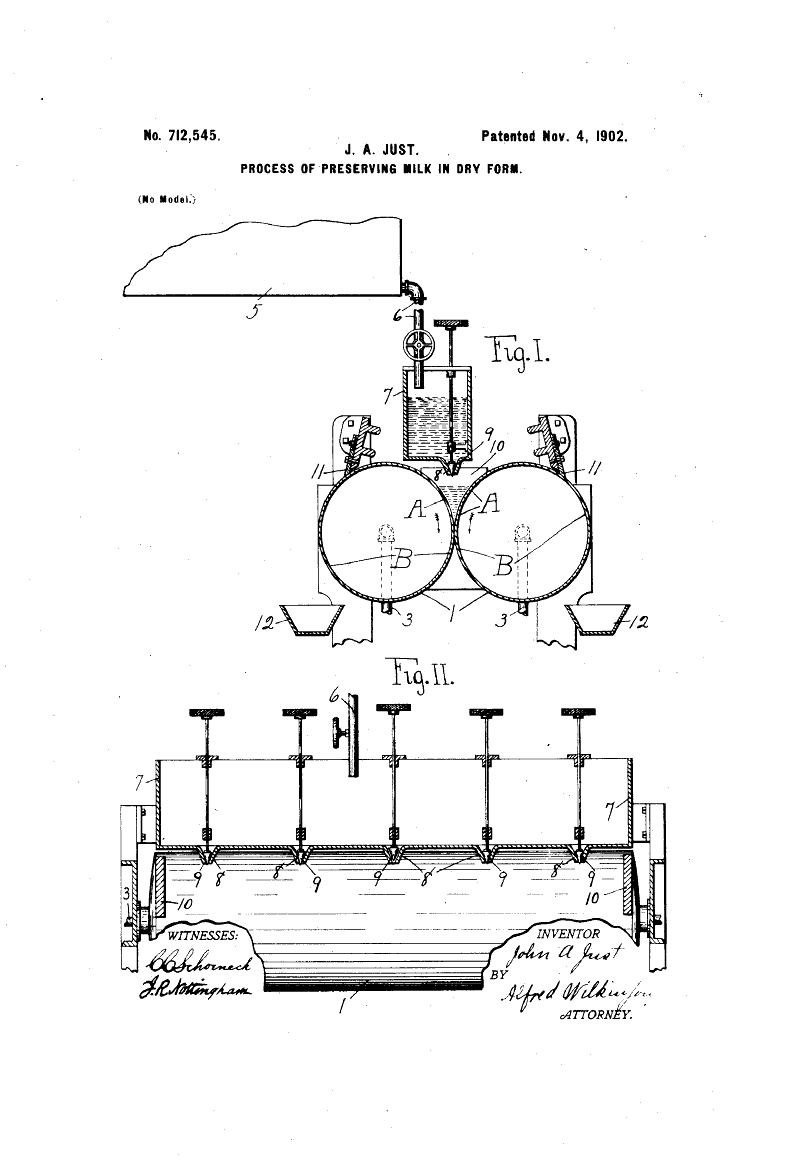
The Just Dry Milk Process

=== Just's Food Company ===
Under US Patent 764,294, Just began to employ his new method of evaporating milk into a dried powder. The technique (later known as the Just Milk Process) involves first treating a sample of milk with calcium chloride to reduce its acidity and then with alkaline hypochlorite to preserve the fatty acids in the finished product. The treated milk is then rolled between two large, horizontal steam-heated rollers. This action dries the milk; it is then scraped off and collected.

Just's Food Tin

Just was instrumental in founding Just's Food Company and the Just Milk Process, which was incorporated on November 15, 1902, with $10,000 in capital. The main product of the company was an infant food, which contained his famous evaporated milk and was praised for its lack of artificial ingredients. The formula was to be diluted in milk and was said to be "nearly like the natural food of an infant". Physicians in Syracuse regarded it highly for its nutritional value claiming "It is in the proper physiological form and the right proportion to grow strong bones, steady nerves and hard, firm flesh".

Extensive testing was done on Just's dried milk to analyze its nutritional value and purity. When compared with other forms of dried milk, the Just Process produced a product that was superior in vitamin and mineral content and solubility, and aided in preventing certain childhood diseases. The company was later bought by the Merrell-Soule Company, which became one of the largest dried-milk companies in the United States. Just sold the rights to his evaporation process to James Robertson Hatmaker, which became known as the "Just-Hatmaker Process".

=== Just Mining and Extraction Company ===
Just's US Patent 814,294 was a new way to extract precious metals from their ores. Before his invention chlorinizing and roasting of the ore was required, which was found to be too costly in fuel, money and time. The new technique (also known as the Just process) was claimed to be much more efficient and hence, more attractive to mining executives. Just's process included chemical treatment of the ore, completely omitting the costly techniques used before. These chemicals extract the metal directly from the ore, dispensing it in the form of a fine metallic precipitate. This precipitate is washed and melted into ingots, while the extraction chemical is collected and reused.

This development attracted some of the "largest and most expert mining operators of the century as well as capitalists who reckon their wealth by millions". The Just Mining and Extraction Company was incorporated on September 29, 1904, with $250,000 in financial capital. Its immediate success attracted mining expert Major J. M. Reynolds and United States Senators Richard F. Pettigrew of South Dakota and William Andrews Clark of Montana. After visiting Syracuse to analyze the company and its processes, the men decided to construct of a reduction plant in Tonopah, Nevada (an area rich in precious-metal ores).

Given the success of Just's company, corporate growth was both necessary and inevitable. Mr. A. Wiswall, an associate of the company, told a newspaper reporter in Syracuse that "the Just Mining and Extraction Company is moving forward steadily without interruption and delay". On April 7, 1905, the Just Process Company was incorporated with capital of $1,000,000, and Just was elected scientific director of the new company. The name of the company was officially changed from the Just Mining and Extraction Company to the Just Process Company on March 10, 1910, following Just's death.

== Later life and death ==
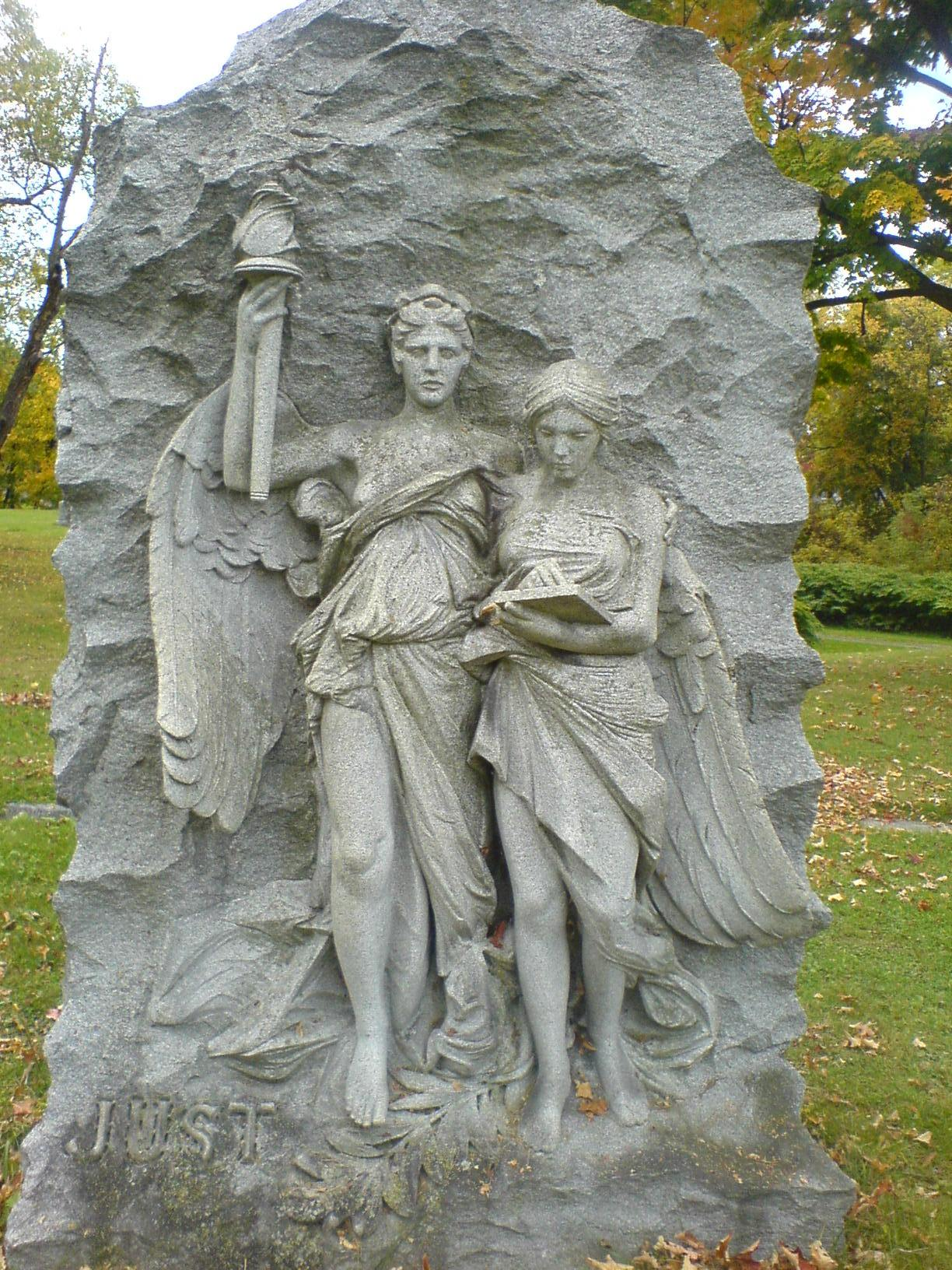
The Just Monument, Syracuse, NY

In October 1905 Just and his wife traveled to Europe, touring England, Ireland, France, Italy and Switzerland. In Paris they met a mining engineer, who asked Just to visit the tin mines in Cornwall, England. During his visit to the mines, he collected a sample of ore and brought it back to Syracuse for experimentation.

Just was appointed chairman of the Syracuse branch of the National Board of Health in June 1908. However, he was stricken with a chronic illness that year and spent much of his time at the family's summer home in Cazenovia, New York. Two weeks before his death, his condition further deteriorated; his family moved him to his Syracuse home where he died on September 13, 1908, aged 54 years. He is buried in Syracuse under the Just Monument, designed by his wife and sculpted by Charles E. Tefft.

== Organizations ==
John Augustus Just was a member of scientific organizations from many countries. These organizations include:

- American Association for the Advancement of Science
- American Chemical Society
- American Geographical Society
- Chemists Club of New York
- American Academy of Political and Social Science
- American Forestry Association
- Society for the Protection of the Adirondack Mountains
- New York section of the Chemical Industry
- National Geographical Society of Washington D.C.
- Heidelberg Club of Syracuse
- Royal Meteorological Society of London
- Society of Arts and Commerce of London
- International Congress of Applied Science of Berlin and Rome

== Patents ==
Just was reported to have nearly 170 patents worldwide; the following are US patents (by number and date) registered under his name:

- 317,769....May 12, 1885
- 348,165....August 24, 1886
- 354,477....December 14, 1886
- 391,158....October 16, 1888
- 391,159....October 16, 1888
- 495,462....April 11, 1893
- 520,600....May 29, 1894
- 536,633....April 2, 1895
- 540,791....June 11, 1895
- 540,792....June 11, 1895
- 561,322....June 2, 1896
- 651,358....June 12, 1900
- 658,988....October 2, 1900
- 661,765....November 13, 1900
- 666,806....January 29, 1901
- 666,807....January 29, 1901
- 670,372....March 19, 1901
- 682,549....September 10, 1901
- 692,450....February 4, 1902
- 692,451....February 4, 1902
- 692,452....February 4, 1902
- 692,454....February 4, 1902
- 712,545....November 4, 1902
- 713,309....November 11, 1902
- 716,803....December 23, 1902
- 764,294....July 5, 1904
- 765,343....July 19, 1904
- 788,912....May 2, 1905
- 789,858....May 16, 1905
- 814,294....March 6, 1906
- 820,000....May 8, 1906
- 841,153....January 15, 1907
- 851,673....April 30, 1907
- 868,444....October 15, 1907
- 868,445....October 15, 1907
- 868,446....October 15, 1907
- 868,447....October 15, 1907
- 888,016....May 19, 1908
- 888,017....May 19, 1908
- 888,018....May 19, 1908
- 939,138....November 2, 1909
