= Once in a Lifetime =

Once in a Lifetime may refer to:

== Film and television ==
- Once in a Lifetime (1932 film), based on the play by Kaufman and Hart, starring Jack Oakie
- Once in a Lifetime, a 1984 TV special by Talking Heads, also known as "Talking Heads vs. Television"
- Once in a Lifetime (1994 film), a TV film based on a novel by Danielle Steele (see below)
- Once in a Lifetime, a 1995 Hong Kong film starring Sean Lau
- Once in a Lifetime (2000 film) (Livet är en schlager), a Swedish film
- Once in a Lifetime (2014 film), a French film
- Once in a Lifetime: The Extraordinary Story of the New York Cosmos, a 2006 documentary
- "Once in a Lifetime" (Ally McBeal), a 1998 TV episode
- "Once in a Lifetime" (Eureka), a 2006 TV episode

== Music ==
=== Albums ===
- Once in a Lifetime (Blutengel album), 2013
- Once in a Lifetime (David Meece album), 1993
- Once in a Lifetime (Runrig album), 1988
- Once in a Lifetime (Talking Heads album), a box set by Talking Heads
- Once in a Lifetime: The Best of Talking Heads, a compilation album by Talking Heads
- Once in a Lifetime Original Soundtrack, a soundtrack album from the 2006 documentary
- Once in a Lifetime, a 2010 compilation album by Sodagreen

=== Songs ===
- "Once in a Lifetime" (Talking Heads song), 1980
- "Once in a Lifetime" (Keith Urban song), 2006
- "To nie ja!", a song by Edyta Górniak, released in English as "Once in a Lifetime", 1994
- "Once in a Lifetime", the Estonian entry in the Eurovision Song Contest 2000
- "Once in a Lifetime", a song by 12 Stones from Anthem for the Underdog
- "Once in a Lifetime", a song by All Time Low
- "Once in a Lifetime", a song by Bananarama from Wow!
- "Once in a Lifetime", a song by Beyoncé Knowles from Cadillac Records: Music from the Motion Picture
- "Once in a Lifetime", a song by Chicago from Chicago 17
- "Once in a Lifetime", a song by Craig David from Born to Do It
- "Once in a Lifetime", a song by Dragonforce from Sonic Firestorm
- "Once in a Lifetime", a song by Flo Rida from My House
- "Once in a Lifetime", a song by Full Intention
- "Once in a Lifetime", a song by Gregorian from Sadisfaction
- "Once in a Lifetime", a song by Kansas from In the Spirit of Things
- "Once in a Lifetime", a song by Michael Bolton from the 1994 film Only You
- "Once in a Lifetime", a song by Monica from Still Standing
- "Once in a Lifetime", a song by The Night Game from The Night Game
- "Once in a Lifetime", a song by Oleta Adams from Moving On
- "Once in a Lifetime", a song by One Direction from Four
- "Once in a Lifetime", a song by Wolfsheim from Spectators
- "Once in a Lifetime", a song from the stage musical Stop the World – I Want to Get Off
- "Once in a Lifetime Love", a song by Clay Walker
- “Once in a Lifetime”, a song by Stick Figure from World on Fire

== Other uses ==
- Once in a Lifetime (play), a 1930 comedy by George S. Kaufman and Moss Hart
- Once in a Lifetime, a 1982 novel by Danielle Steel
- Once in a Lifetime, a performance DVD by Howard Morrison
- Once in a Lifetime, the tagline for the wrestling match between The Rock and John Cena at WrestleMania XXVIII
- Once in a Lifetime, a 2020 adult mystery game made by Caribdis

== See also ==
- Once in a LIVEtime, a 1998 live album by Dream Theater
- Twice in a Lifetime (disambiguation)
- Once in a Blue Moon (disambiguation)
