= Keller Williams Realty =

American real estate franchise headquartered in Austin Texas

Keller Williams
- Type: Privately Held Corporation
- Industry: Real estate
- Founded: 1983 in Austin, Texas
- Headquarters: Austin, Texas, United States
- Number of locations: 1,000
- Key people: Gary W. Keller, Executive chairman Chris Czarnecki, President and CEO, KWRI; Chris Cox, CTO
- Number of employees: 200,000+ associates
- Website: www.kw.com

Keller Williams Realty (commonly referred to as Keller Williams) is an American technology and international real estate franchise with headquarters in Austin, Texas. It is the largest real estate franchise in the United States by sales volume as of 2022.

Founded in 1983 by Gary Keller and Joe Williams, it grew from a single office in Austin to approximately 1,000 offices worldwide in 2025 and over 200,000 associates worldwide as of 2022. It is an Inc. 5000 company and has been recognized as one of the highest rated real estate companies by numerous publications, including Entrepreneur and Forbes.

== History ==
=== Founding and early history ===
Keller Williams was founded in 1983 by Gary Keller and Joe Williams. It started out as a single office based in Austin, Texas, selling local residential real estate in the Austin area. After two years in business, Keller Williams became the largest single office residential real estate firm in Austin with 72 licensed agents. In the mid-1980s, the company suffered from the United States housing bubble and began to offer profit sharing to existing and potential associates to retain agents and help get through the recession. Within a year, the company grew to 130 agents and began to climb back as the top real estate broker in Austin.

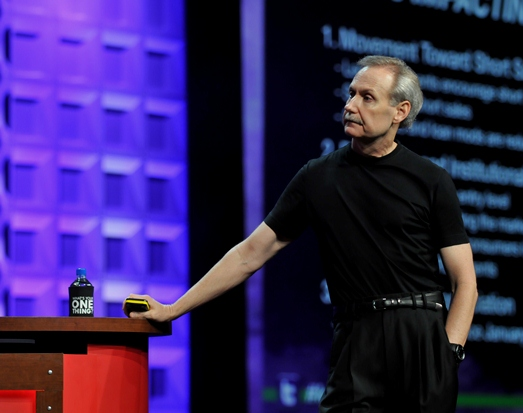
Keller Williams co-founder Gary Keller speaking at an event in 2012.

In the early 1990s, Keller Williams expanded outside the state of Texas, opening up its business model to franchising beginning in 1991. It opened an office in Oklahoma in 1993, marking the firm's first office to be located outside its home state. The Oklahoma office was later recognized as the most successful single real estate office in that state. Keller Williams expanded at a rapid rate throughout the United States, much of which was attributed to its commission split for agents. In 1997 the company was recognized by being on the Franchise Gold 100 list by Success Magazine. As it moved into the next century, Keller Williams became the 6th largest real estate agency in the U.S. An example of its rapid expansion came in the state of Florida where in 2004 it was attributed as the largest real estate office in Polk County with 114 agents. That same year, it was attributed as the fastest growing real estate office in the entire state with 45 market centers, bringing its total nationwide agent count to over 30,000.

Keller Williams continued expanding and in 2007, the company launched Luxury Homes by Keller Williams, a division within the company that brokers luxury only real estate. In 2008, it launched KW Commercial, a division providing commercial real estate associates with specialized technology, marketing tools, and resources. The division is known for allowing agents to keep more commission splits. It also allowed profit sharing similar to residential agents. As of 2012, the division boasted more than 1,000 brokers nationally.

=== 2010 to 2016: International expansion ===
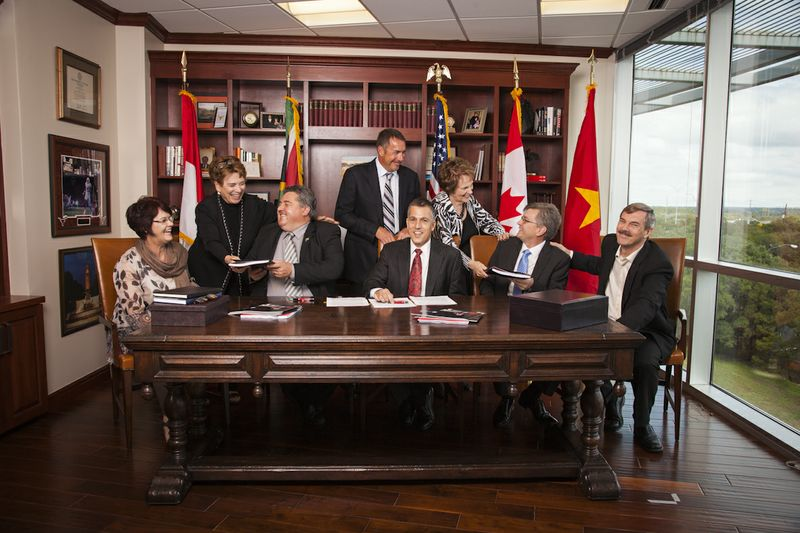
Keller Williams Realty franchise signing in South Africa in 2012.

By the end of the decade in 2010, Keller Williams had 77,672 real estate agents in the United States. It surpassed Century 21 as the second largest real estate agency in the U.S., two years after taking over the third spot from RE/MAX International. Between 2005 and 2011, the company saw a 40 percent increase in the number of offices in North America. Keller Williams went international in 2012, launching Keller Williams Worldwide as a subdivision to manage its international franchising. It awarded its first overseas franchise in Vietnam in 2012. The same year, franchising of the company was made available in Indonesia and Southern Africa, and in 2013 expanded to Germany, Austria, Switzerland, Turkey, and the United Kingdom.

At the end of April 2014, Keller Williams reached 100,575 agents worldwide. This was due to an 18 percent increase in agents in 2013. As of 2014, it is the largest real estate franchise by agent count in North America and the only privately held global residential real estate brokerage. In 2014, the company also announced the opening of a region in Dubai. The first Dubai franchise was awarded to a leadership group affiliated with IFA Hotels & Resorts which is considered the largest foreign investor in Palm Jumeirah.

=== 2017 to present: Transition to technology company and KWx ===
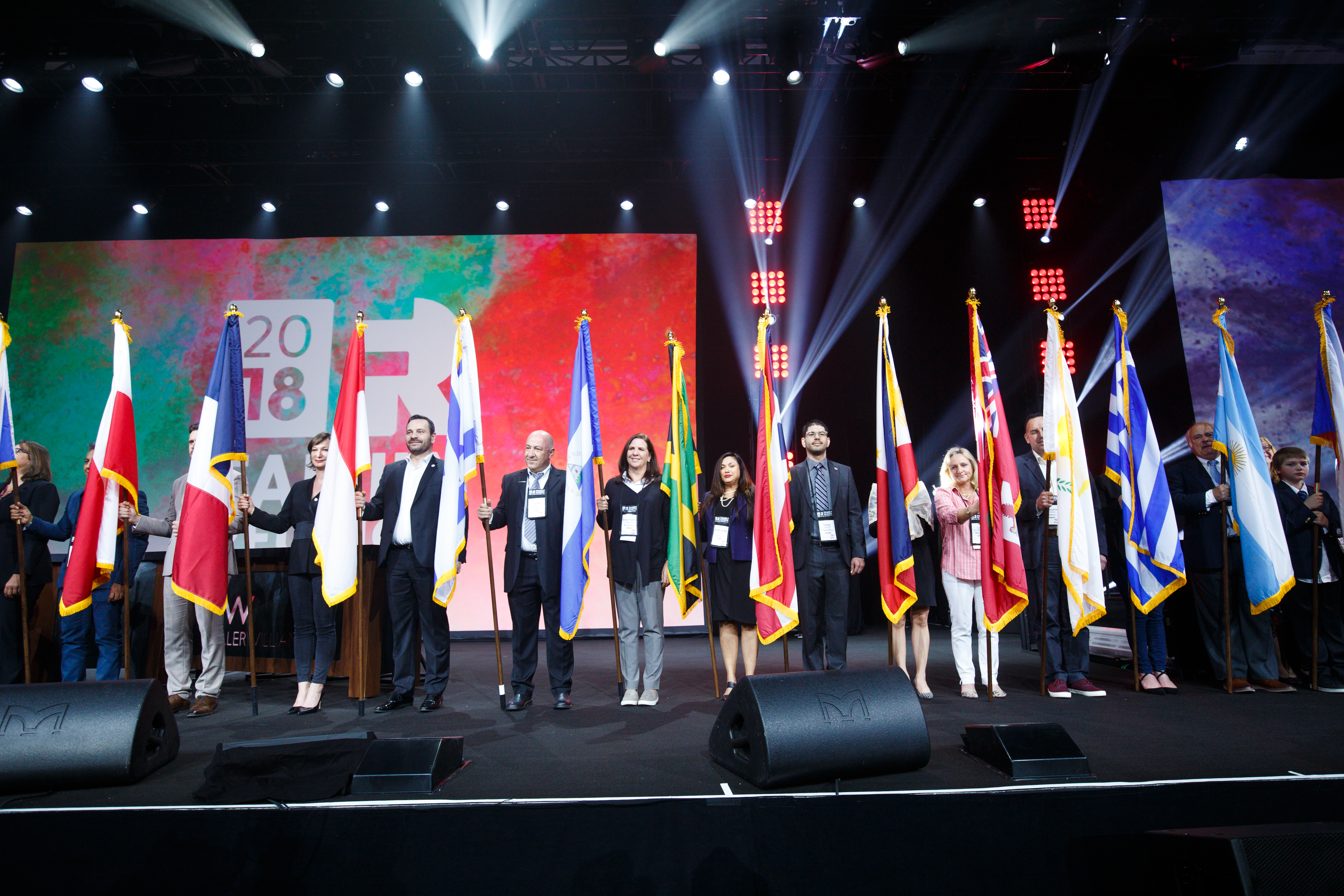
Keller Williams Realty family reunion conference 2018.

Keller Williams topped $67.1 billion in sales volume in 2016, up 22 percent from the previous year. The company began to position itself as a technology company in 2017. In 2017 it launched KW Labs, a division of the company process devoted to the building and testing of technology created by the company alongside its agents. This was in addition to KW Keller Cloud. It also introduced "Kelle", an artificial intelligence app which has been referred to as Siri but for real estate used as a virtual assistant, and an agent-to-agent referral tools platform called "Referrals". Keller Williams claims it is the number one franchise in the United States by sales volume in 2017, ranking number one in agents and units sold in 2017.

Keller Williams continued expansion into South America in 2018, opening franchises in Argentina, and adding to already existing locations in Colombia, Belize, Nicaragua, and Panama. It also expanded to Cambodia as well as Belgium and Luxembourg. Gary Keller replaced John Davis as CEO of the company in 2019, adding to his already title of Chairman of the company. The same year the company expanded into Morocco.

Keller Williams formed KWx in 2020, a holding company to oversee its portfolio of companies. It named Carl Liebert as the new CEO of the group with Gary Keller becoming the executive chairman. Josh Team also left Keller Williams with Marc King being promoted to the role of president.

== Company divisions ==
- Keller Williams Worldwide – Keller Williams Worldwide is responsible for the company's global franchising and expansion.
- KellerINK – KellerINK is the publishing arm of Keller Williams, responsible for the publishing of instructional and inspirational business books with a specialty in real estate. The company published Millionaire Real Estate series and The ONE Thing: The Surprisingly Simple Truth Behind Extraordinary Results. They have sold more than a million books worldwide.
- Luxury Homes by Keller Williams – Luxury Homes by Keller Williams is the company's luxury real estate arm.
- KW Commercial – Division of Keller Williams responsible for brokering commercial real estate.
- KW Labs – Keller Williams' technology division that develops and test software created by the company.

== Philanthropy ==
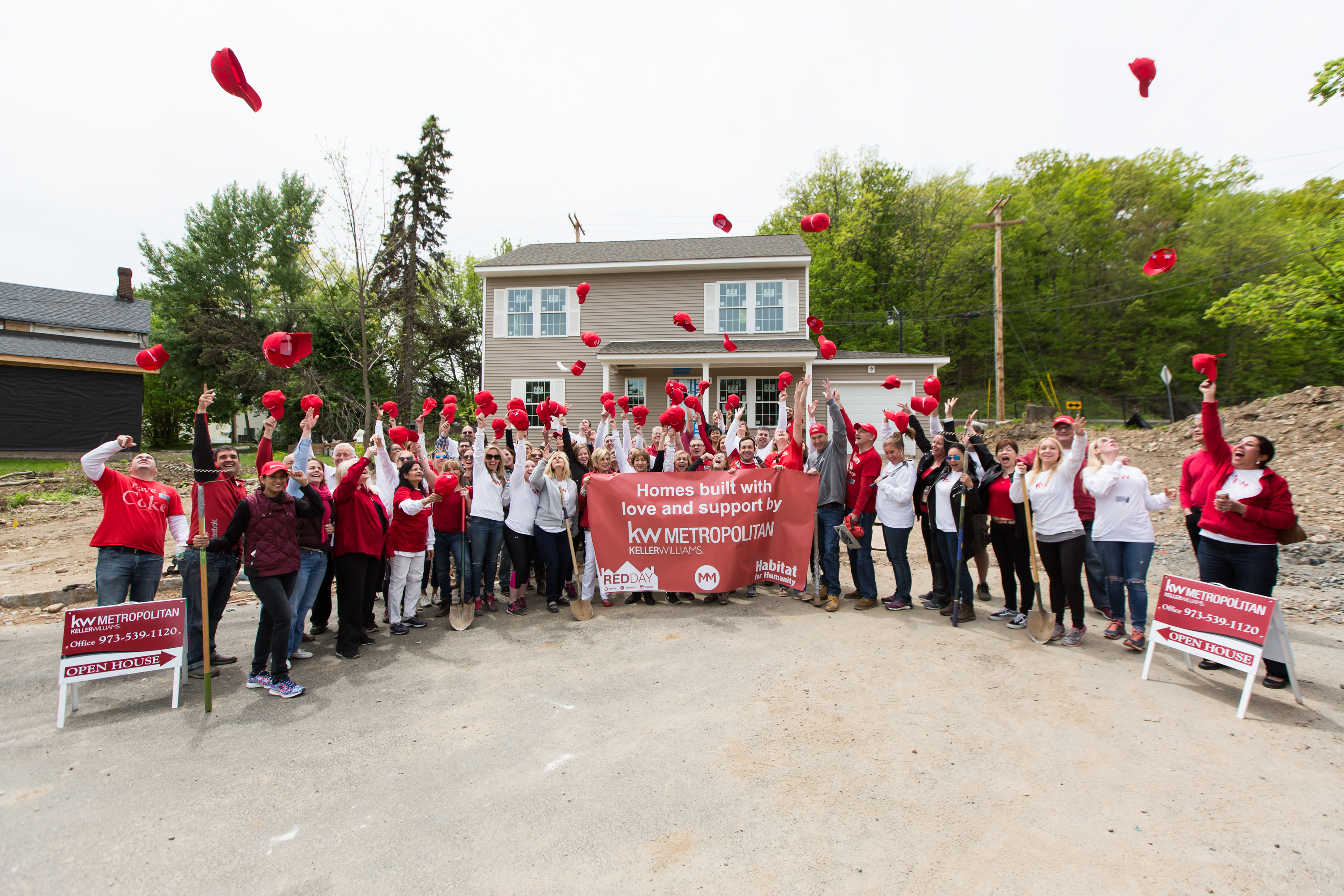
Employees of Keller Williams Realty participating in "RED Day".

Keller Williams operates a charitable arm known as KW Cares which is a nonprofit organization set up to assist both local communities as well as associates of the company and their families deal with hardships and emergencies. Examples of giving include providing assistance to help fight serious illness or recover from a life altering accident. The organization also donates to various other nonprofits including the Ryan's Well Foundation, Homes For Our Troops, and the M. D. Anderson Cancer Center.

Beginning in 2009, Keller Williams began organizing a one-day yearly event where all associates spend a day away from the office donating their time to their local communities. Known among the associates as RED Day (Renew, Energize, and Donate), all Keller Williams offices close for the day to take part in the event. Since its inception, associates have been involved with projects that include rebuilding homes, hosting blood drives, giving to local food shelters, and refurbishing local parks.

== Awards and recognition ==
Keller Williams has received numerous awards since its inception. In addition to being an Inc. 5000 company, it has been recognized by Inc. as a Top 100 Real Estate Company, placed on the magazine's honor role as a five-time Inc. 5000 Honoree, and receiving an Inc. Hire Power Award. Further recognition has come from Entrepreneur where it has been featured in the magazine's Best of the Best franchise list as well as inclusion in their Franchise 500 rankings. The company was recognized as the number one training company by Training Magazine in 2017; and, inducted into the publication's Training Hall of Fame in 2018. In 2018, it was listed as one of the "happiest companies to work for" by Career Bliss as reported by Forbes.

== See also ==
- List of companies based in Austin, Texas
- List of franchises
- List of real estate topics
- Real estate trends
