= Just One More Thing =

Just One More Thing may refer to:

- "Just one more thing", a catchphrase used by fictional TV police detective Lieutenant Columbo from Columbo
- Just One More Thing: Stories From My Life, a 2006 memoir by Peter Falk, the actor who portrayed Lieutenant Columbo
- "Just One More Thing", 1996 episode 2 of U.S. drama TV show Relativity
- "Just One More Thing", a children's song from the 1997 direct-to-video special "Barney's Good Day Good Night" in the Barney & Friends franchise
- "Just One More Thing", a 2002 song by Sara Groves off the album All Right Here
- "Just One More Thing...", a 2010 stand-up show by Alex Zane at the Edinburgh Festival

== See also ==
- Just One Thing, BBC radio show
