= List of National Inventors Hall of Fame inductees =

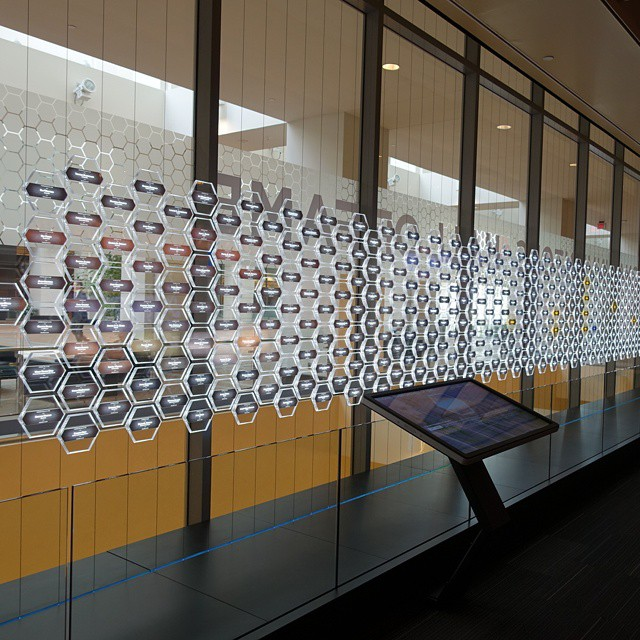
Display of inductees in the National Inventors Hall of Fame in Alexandria

The National Inventors Hall of Fame (NIHF) is an American not-for-profit organization, founded in 1973, which recognizes individual engineers and inventors who hold a U.S. patent of significant technology.

The inventor list constitutes historic persons from the past three centuries in addition to living inductees. Nominees must hold a U.S. patent of significant contribution to public welfare, and which advances science and the useful arts. John Fitch (anno 1743) was the earliest born inventor inducted into the NIHF.

== Inductees ==
* Denotes inventor was also awarded the IEEE Medal of Honor

Year	Inductee	Birth year	Notable for	NIHF
1973	Thomas Edison	1847	Electric lighting, motion pictures, phonograph	
1974	Alexander Graham Bell	1847	Telephone	
1974	Eli Whitney	1765	Cotton gin	
1974	Walter Houser Brattain	1902	Transistor	
1974	William Shockley	1910	Transistor	
1974	John Bardeen*	1908	Transistor	
1975	Nikola Tesla	1856	Induction motor	
1975	Orville Wright	1871	Airplane	
1975	Samuel Morse	1791	Telegraph	
1975	Wilbur Wright	1867	Airplane	
1975	William D. Coolidge	1873	X-ray tube	
1975	Guglielmo Marconi*	1874	Radio	
1976	Charles Martin Hall	1863	Aluminum production process	
1976	Charles Goodyear	1800	Vulcanization of rubber	
1976	Cyrus McCormick	1809	Mechanical reaper	
1976	Enrico Fermi	1901	Nuclear fission	
1976	Rudolf Diesel	1858	Internal-combustion engine	
1976	Charles Hard Townes*	1915	Laser	
1977	Charles Steinmetz	1865	Alternating current	
1977	Edwin H. Land	1909	Polaroid	
1977	George Eastman	1854	Photography	
1977	Lee De Forest*	1873	Audion amplifier tube	
1977	Vladimir K. Zworykin*	1888	Cathode-ray tube	
1978	Carl Djerassi	1923	Oral contraceptives	
1978	Leo Baekeland	1863	Bakelite	
1978	Louis Pasteur	1822	Pasteurization	
1978	Luis Walter Alvarez	1911	Radar, liquid hydrogen bubble chamber	
1979	Charles J. Plank	1915	Catalytic cracking	
1979	Edward J. Rosinski	1921	Catalytic cracking	
1979	Robert H. Goddard	1882	Solid fuel rockets	
1979	Jay Wright Forrester*	1918	Random access memory (RAM)	
1980	Charles F. Kettering	1876	Electric ignition	
1980	James Hillier	1915	Electron microscope	
1980	Lewis Hastings Sarett	1917	Cortisone	
1980	Edwin Howard Armstrong*	1890	FM radio	
1981	Charles Stark Draper	1901	Stabilizing gyroscopic	
1981	Chester Carlson	1906	Xerographic printing	
1981	Harold Stephen Black	1898	Feedback amplifier	
1981	Nicolaus Otto	1832	Otto cycle for internal combustion engine	
1982	Ernest Lawrence	1901	Cyclotron	
1982	Henry Ford	1863	Automobile	
1982	Max Tishler	1906	Synthetic vitamins	
1982	Ottmar Mergenthaler	1854	Linotype	
1982	Jack Kilby*	1923	Integrated circuit	
1983	Andrew Alford	1904	VHF omnidirectional range	
1983	George Stibitz	1904	Digital computer	
1983	Herbert Henry Dow	1866	Bromine extraction	
1983	Ernst Alexanderson*	1878	High frequency alternator for radio	
1983	Robert Noyce*	1927	Integrated circuit	
1984	Philo Farnsworth	1906	Television	
1984	Theodore Harold Maiman	1927	Laser	
1984	Wallace Carothers	1896	Synthetic rubber, nylon	
1984	William Merriam Burton	1865	Catalytic cracking	
1985	Louis Marius Moyroud	1914	Photocomposing machine	
1985	Marvin Camras	1916	Magnetic recording	
1985	Rene Alphonse Higonnet	1902	Photocomposing machine	
1985	Roy J. Plunkett	1910	Teflon	
1985	Willem Johan Kolff	1911	Artificial heart	
1985	Willis Carrier	1876	Air conditioner	
1986	Donalee L. Tabern	1900	Pentothal	
1986	Ernest H. Volwiler	1893	Pentothal	
1986	Harold Eugene Edgerton	1903	Stroboscope photography	
1986	Luther Burbank	1849	Plant breeding	
1986	Wilson Greatbatch	1919	Heart pacemaker	
1987	Andrew J. Moyer	1899	Penicillin	
1987	Arnold Orville Beckman	1900	pH meter	
1987	Igor Sikorsky	1889	Helicopter	
1987	William Seward Burroughs I	1857	Adding machine	
1988	An Wang	1920	Magnetic core memory	
1988	Elisha Otis	1811	Elevator brake	
1988	Frank B. Colton	1923	Oral contraceptives	
1988	Louis W. Parker	1906	Television receiver	
1989	George Westinghouse	1846	Air brake system	
1989	Irving Langmuir	1881	Electric lighting	
1989	John Deere	1804	Farm plow	
1989	Raymond Vahan Damadian	1936	Magnetic resonance imaging (MRI)	
1990	C. Robin Ganellin	1934	Cimetidine	
1990	Charles Ginsburg	1920	Video tape recording	
1990	Eugene Houdry	1892	Catalytic cracking	
1990	George Washington Carver	1864	Peanut products	
1990	Graham J. Durant	1934	Cimetidine	
1990	Herman Hollerith	1860	Punch card tabulator	
1990	John Colin Emmett	1939	Cimetidine	
1990	Ken Olsen	1926	Magnetic core memory	
1990	Percy Lavon Julian	1899	Cortisone synthesis	
1990	Robert Ledley	1926	Whole-body CAT scan	
1991	Donald F. Holmes	1910	Polyurethane	
1991	Elmer Ambrose Sperry	1860	Gyroscopic compass	
1991	Gertrude B. Elion	1918	Antileukemic drug	
1991	Gordon Gould	1920	Optically pumped laser amplifier	
1991	Leonard Greene	1918	Aircraft stall warning	
1991	Robert R. Williams	1886	Vitamin synthesis	
1991	Willard Harrison Bennett	1903	Mass spectrometry	
1991	William Edward Hanford	1908	Polyurethane	
1992	Benjamin Rubin	1917	Vaccine needle	
1992	Charles F. Brannock	1903	Brannock device for foot measuring	
1992	Frederick Gardner Cottrell	1877	Electrostatic precipitator	
1992	Lloyd Conover	1923	Tetracycline	
1992	William Redington Hewlett	1913	Audio oscillator	
1993	Baruch Samuel Blumberg	1925	Vaccine for hepatitis B	
1993	Bill Lear	1902	8-track system, car radio	
1993	Donald Keck	1941	Optical fiber	
1993	Irving Millman	1923	Vaccine for hepatitis B	
1993	John T. Parsons	1913	Numerical control	
1993	John Ericsson	1803	Screw propeller	
1993	Peter C. Schultz	1942	Optical fiber	
1993	Robert D. Maurer	1924	Optical fiber	
1994	Elizabeth Lee Hazen	1885	Nystatin (antifungal / antibiotic)	
1994	Emile Berliner	1851	Gramophone and microphone	
1994	Gerd Binnig	1947	Scanning tunneling microscope	
1994	Heinrich Rohrer	1933	Scanning tunneling microscope	
1994	Rachel Fuller Brown	1898	Nystatin (antifungal / antibiotic)	
1994	Robert H. Rines	1922	High resolution radar and sonar	
1994	Robert N. Hall	1919	Magnetron	
1995	Forrest Bird	1921	Respirator / Ventilator	
1995	John C. Sheehan	1915	Structure and synthesis of penicillin	
1995	Joseph H. Burckhalter	1912	Isothiocyanates	
1995	Robert J. Seiwald	1925	Isothiocyanates	
1995	Stephanie Kwolek	1923	Kevlar	
1995	Waldo Semon	1898	Polyvinyl chloride	
1995	William Stanley Jr.	1858	Induction coil	
1996	Leó Szilárd	1898	Neutronic atomic reactor	
1996	Arthur Leonard Schawlow	1921	Laser	
1996	Edmund Germer	1901	Fluorescent lighting	
1996	Federico Faggin	1941	Microprocessor, silicon-gate MOSFET transistor	
1996	Julius Nieuwland	1878	Synthetic rubber	
1996	Marcian Hoff	1937	Microprocessor	
1996	Stanley Mazor	1941	Central processing unit (CPU)	
1997	Dennis L. Moeller	1950	Computer peripherals	
1997	Edward Goodrich Acheson	1856	Carborundum	
1997	George Herman Babcock	1832	Water-tube boiler	
1997	Mark Dean	1957	Computer peripherals	
1997	Robert W. Bower	1936	Self-aligned-gate MOSFET transistor	
1997	Seymour Cray	1925	Supercomputer	
1997	Stephen Wilcox	1830	Water-tube boiler	
1997	Robert H. Dennard*	1932	Dynamic random access memory (DRAM)	
1998	Alfred Nobel	1833	Dynamite	
1998	Douglas Engelbart	1925	Computer mouse	
1998	Henry Timken	1831	Tapered roller ball bearings	
1998	James Fergason	1934	Liquid crystal display	
1998	Kary Mullis	1944	Polymerase chain reaction	
1998	Semi Joseph Begun	1905	Magnetic recording	
1999	Bryan Molloy	1939	Prozac	
1999	Charlie Tyson	1905	Catalytic cracking	
1999	Donald L. Campbell	1904	Catalytic cracking	
1999	Eger V. Murphree	1898	Catalytic cracking	
1999	George de Mestral	1907	Velcro	
1999	Gerhard M. Sessler	1931	Electret microphone	
1999	Homer Martin	1910	Catalytic cracking	
1999	James West	1931	Electret microphone	
1999	Klaus Schmiegel	1939	Prozac	
1999	Percy Spencer	1894	Magnetron	
2000	Alfred Free	1913	Glucose detection for diabetes	
2000	Helen Murray Free	1923	Glucose detection for diabetes	
2000	James Franklin Hyde	1903	Transparent silica	
2000	Steve Wozniak	1950	Personal computer	
2000	Walt Disney	1901	Multiplane camera	
2000	William Justin Kroll	1889	Titanium	
2000	Reginald Fessenden*	1866	AM radio	
2001	Christopher Latham Sholes	1819	Typewriter	
2001	Elijah McCoy	1844	Engine lubricator	
2001	Herbert Boyer	1936	Genetic engineering	
2001	J. Paul Hogan	1919	Polypropylene and HDPE	
2001	Oliver Evans	1755	High-pressure steam engine	
2001	Patsy O'Connell Sherman	1930	Scotchgard	
2001	Robert Banks	1921	Polyethylene and polypropylene plastics	
2001	Samuel Smith	1927	Scotchgard	
2001	Stanley Norman Cohen	1935	Genetic engineering	
2001	Thomas J. Fogarty	1934	Fogarty embolectomy catheter	
2002	Alois Langer	1945	Defibrillator	
2002	Felix Hoffmann	1868	Aspirin	
2002	Henry Bessemer	1813	Bessemer process for steel production	
2002	Irwin Lachman	1930	Catalytic converter	
2002	J. Presper Eckert	1919	ENIAC	
2002	James J. Wynne	1943	LASIK eye surgery	
2002	John Mauchly	1907	ENIAC	
2002	M. Stephen Heilman	1933	Defibrillator	
2002	Michel Mirowski	1924	Defibrillator	
2002	Morton Mower	1933	Implantable heart defibrillator	
2002	Nils Bohlin	1920	Safety belt	
2002	Rangaswamy Srinivasan	1929	LASIK eye surgery	
2002	Raymond Kurzweil	1948	Optical character recognition	
2002	Rodney Bagley	1934	Substrate for catalytic converters	
2002	Ronald M. Lewis	1936	Catalytic converter	
2002	Samuel E. Blum	1920	LASIK eye surgery	
2003	Charles Kaman	1919	Innovations to helicopter	
2003	Edwin Albert Link	1904	Link Trainer	
2003	Frank Cepollina	1936	Satellite servicing techniques	
2003	Frank Whittle	1907	Jet engine	
2003	George Robert Carruthers	1939	Ultraviolet camera	
2003	Glenn Curtiss	1878	Hydroplane	
2003	Hans von Ohain	1911	Turbojet	
2003	Harold Rosen	1926	Geosynchronous communications satellite	
2003	John Knudsen Northrop	1895	Flying wing plane	
2003	Leroy Grumman	1895	Retractable landing gear, folding wing	
2003	Maxime Faget	1921	Space capsule design	
2003	Paul Kollsman	1900	Altimeter	
2003	Richard T. Whitcomb	1921	Supercritical wing	
2003	Sam B. Williams	1921	Contributions to jet engine	
2003	Theodore von Kármán	1881	Turbojet	
2003	Thomas Midgley Jr.	1889	Ethyl gasoline, fluorocarbon refrigerants	
2003	John R. Pierce*	1910	Communications satellite	
2004	Bernard M. Oliver	1916	Pulse-code modulation	
2004	Bradford Parkinson	1935	Global positioning system (GPS)	
2004	Charles Best	1899	Isolation of insulin	
2004	Charles Kelman	1930	Cataract surgery	
2004	Edith M. Flanigen	1929	Molecular sieves	
2004	Elias Howe	1819	Sewing machine	
2004	Frederick Banting	1891	Isolated and purified insulin	
2004	Harry Coover	1917	Superglue	
2004	Ivan A. Getting	1912	Global Positioning System (GPS)	
2004	James Collip	1892	Isolated and purified insulin	
2004	John A. Roebling	1806	Suspension bridge	
2004	John Heysham Gibbon	1903	Heart-lung machine	
2004	Lloyd Hall	1894	Food preservation	
2004	Luc Montagnier	1932	HIV isolation and antibody test	
2004	Norbert Rillieux	1806	Refined sugar	
2004	Ray Dolby	1933	Dolby noise reduction	
2004	Robert Gallo	1937	HIV isolation	
2004	Vannevar Bush	1890	Differential analyzer	
2004	Wallace H. Coulter	1913	Coulter principle	
2004	Claude Shannon*	1916	Pulse-code modulation	
2005	Alec Jeffreys	1950	Genetic fingerprinting	
2005	C. Donald Bateman	1932	Ground proximity warning system	
2005	Clarence Birdseye	1886	Frozen food	
2005	Dean Kamen	1951	Ambulatory infusion pump	
2005	Garrett A. Morgan	1887	Gas mask, three-way traffic signal	
2005	Glenn T. Seaborg	1912	Plutonium isolation	
2005	Jacob Rabinow	1910	Optical character recognition	
2005	Leo Sternbach	1908	Benzodiazepines	
2005	Leopold Godowsky Jr.	1900	Kodachrome	
2005	Leopold Mannes	1899	Kodachrome	
2005	Les Paul	1915	Solid-body electric guitar	
2005	Matthias W. Baldwin	1795	Steam locomotive	
2005	Robert Gundlach	1926	Photocopier	
2005	Selman Waksman	1888	Streptomycin	
2006	Alexander Lyman Holley	1832	Steelmaking	
2006	Alexander Winton	1860	Contributions to automobile, bicycle, and diesel engine	
2006	Ali Javan	1926	Helium-neon laser	
2006	Almon Brown Strowger	1839	Telephone dial	
2006	Ambrose Swasey	1846	Improvements to telescope	
2006	Andrew Jackson Beard	1849	Janney coupler for railroad cars	
2006	Andrew Smith Hallidie	1836	Cable car	
2006	Benjamin Holt	1849	Track-type tractor	
2006	Beulah Louise Henry	1887	Ice cream freezer	
2006	Birdsill Holly	1820	Fire hydrant	
2006	Bob Kahn	1938	Internet Protocol (IP)	
2006	Carl Bosch	1874	Haber–Bosch process for ammonia production	
2006	Charles F. Brush	1849	Arc light for street lighting	
2006	Charles Grafton Page	1812	High-voltage induction coil	
2006	Charles Sumner Tainter	1854	Innovations in sound recording	
2006	Dale Kleist	1909	Fiberglass	
2006	Eckley Coxe	1839	Traveling grate furnace	
2006	Edward A. Calahan	1838	Stock ticker	
2006	Edward Weston	1850	Portable voltmeter	
2006	Elihu Thomson	1853	Arc lamp	
2006	Erastus Brigham Bigelow	1814	Powered loom	
2006	Ferdinand von Zeppelin	1838	Rigid airship	
2006	Frank J. Sprague	1857	Electric street car	
2006	Fritz Haber	1868	Ammonia production process	
2006	Gail Borden	1801	Process for condensed milk	
2006	Games Slayter	1896	Fiberglass	
2006	George E. Smith	1930	Charge-coupled device	
2006	George Henry Corliss	1817	Improvements to steam engine	
2006	George Hulett	1846	Loading and unloading machine	
2006	George Pullman	1831	Pullman car	
2006	Gideon Sundback	1880	Zipper	
2006	Gottlieb Daimler	1834	Design of automobile and motorcycle engines	
2006	Granville Woods	1856	Railroad telegraph	
2006	Gregory Goodwin Pincus	1903	Oral contraceptives	
2006	Harvey Samuel Firestone	1868	Pneumatic tire	
2006	Helen Blanchard	1840	Innovations to sewing machine	
2006	Herman Affel	1893	Coaxial cable	
2006	Hiram Stevens Maxim	1840	Maxim gun, smokeless gunpowder	
2006	Jacques E. Brandenberger	1872	Cellophane	
2006	James M. Spangler	1848	Portable electric vacuum cleaner	
2006	Jan Ernst Matzeliger	1852	Shoe lasting	
2006	John Boyd Dunlop	1840	Pneumatic tire	
2006	John H. Thomas	1907	Fiberglass	
2006	John Harvey Kellogg	1852	Breakfast cereal	
2006	John Landis Mason	1832	Mason jar	
2006	John Wesley Hyatt	1837	Celluloid	
2006	John Fitch	1743	Steamboat	
2006	John Stevens	1749	Steam-powered transportation	
2006	Joseph Glidden	1813	Barbed wire	
2006	Joseph Saxton	1799	Measuring instruments	
2006	Josephine Cochrane	1839	Dishwasher	
2006	Julio Palmaz	1945	Intravascular stent	
2006	Lester Allan Pelton	1829	Water wheel	
2006	Lewis Howard Latimer	1848	Filament for electric light bulb	
2006	Lewis Miller	1829	Combine harvester	
2006	Lewis Waterman	1837	Fountain pen	
2006	Linus Yale Jr.	1821	Cylinder lock	
2006	Louis Renault	1877	Drum brake	
2006	Margaret E. Knight	1838	Paper bag machine	
2006	Martha Coston	1826	Signal flare used for ships	
2006	Mary Dixon Kies	1752	Process for weaving straw	
2006	Milton Bradley	1836	Game board	
2006	Moses G. Farmer	1820	Electric fire alarm system	
2006	Peter Cooper	1791	Steam locomotive	
2006	Richard March Hoe	1812	Rotary printing press	
2006	Robert S. Langer	1948	Drug delivery	
2006	Robert W. Gore	1937	Gore-Tex	
2006	Robert Fulton	1765	Steamboat	
2006	Samuel Colt	1814	Colt revolver with interchangeable parts	
2006	Seth Boyden	1788	Process for making malleable iron	
2006	Simon Ingersoll	1818	Steam powered rock drill	
2006	Thomas Blanchard	1788	Pattern lathe	
2006	Vint Cerf	1943	Transmission Control Protocol/Internet Protocol (TCP/IP)	
2006	Walter Hunt	1796	Safety pin	
2006	Willard Boyle	1924	Charge-coupled device	
2006	William E. Upjohn	1853	Tablet for delivering medicine	
2006	William Painter	1838	Bottle cap	
2006	Zénobe Gramme	1826	Direct-current dynamo	
2006	Lloyd Espenschied*	1889	Coaxial cable	
2007	László Bíró	1899	Ballpoint pen	
2007	Albert Kingsbury	1863	Thrust bearing	
2007	Alexander Miles	1838	Improving method of opening and closing elevator doors	
2007	Alfred Einhorn	1856	Novocain	
2007	Alpheus Babcock	1785	Cast iron piano frame	
2007	Arthur Nobile	1920	Prednisone	
2007	Auguste Lumière	1862	Cinématographe	
2007	Charles Seeberger	1857	Escalator	
2007	David Cushman	1939	Captopril	
2007	Donald Davies	1924	Digital packet switching	
2007	Eli Whitney Blake	1795	Rock crusher	
2007	Eli Terry	1772	Innovations in clockmaking	
2007	Elisha Gray	1835	Telegraph and telephone improvements	
2007	Emmett Chappelle	1925	Bioluminescence	
2007	Frank Zamboni	1901	Ice resurfacer	
2007	Frederick Ellsworth Sickels	1819	Valve for steam engine	
2007	Frederick McKinley Jones	1893	Refrigeration	
2007	George Crompton	1829	Loom	
2007	Georges Claude	1870	Neon lighting	
2007	Godfrey Hounsfield	1919	CT scan	
2007	James Bogardus	1800	Iron frame building	
2007	Jesse W. Reno	1861	Escalator	
2007	John E. Franz	1929	Roundup glyphosate herbicide	
2007	John Philip Holland	1841	Submarine	
2007	John Raphael Rogers	1856	Automated typesetting	
2007	John Browning	1855	Breech-loading rifle	
2007	John Lynott	1921	Hard drive	
2007	Joshua Lionel Cowen	1877	Toy train	
2007	Katharine Burr Blodgett	1898	Langmuir-Blodgett film	
2007	King C. Gillette	1855	Safety razor	
2007	L. L. Langstroth	1810	Beehive	
2007	Leroy Hood	1938	DNA sequencer	
2007	Louis Comfort Tiffany	1848	Stained glass	
2007	Louis Lumière	1864	Cinématographe	
2007	Maurice Hilleman	1919	Vaccines	
2007	Michael Joseph Owens	1859	Bottle making machine	
2007	Miguel Ondetti	1930	Captopril	
2007	Ole Evinrude	1877	Outboard motor	
2007	Oliver Lodge	1851	Wireless telegraphy	
2007	Otto Wichterle	1913	Soft contact lens	
2007	Paul Baran	1926	Digital packet switching	
2007	Peter Carl Goldmark	1906	Long playing record	
2007	Peter Mansfield	1933	Magnetic resonance imaging (MRI)	
2007	Philip Drinker	1894	Iron lung	
2007	Richard Gurley Drew	1899	Adhesive tape	
2007	Samuel Leeds Allen	1841	Flexible flyer sled	
2007	Samuel Slater	1768	Cotton mill, spinning machine	
2007	Squire Whipple	1804	Iron truss bridge	
2007	Theophilus Van Kannel	1841	Revolving door	
2007	Thomas R. Pickering	1831	Velocipede	
2007	Thomas Seavey Hall	1827	Railroad signal	
2007	Wilhelm Maybach	1846	Carburetor and radiator	
2007	William Goddard	1913	Hard drive and floppy disk	
2007	William Sellers	1824	Improvement in machine tools	
2007	Paul Lauterbur*	1929	Magnetic resonance imaging (MRI)	
2007	Robert Metcalfe*	1946	Ethernet	
2008	Amar Bose	1929	Audio feedback control	
2008	Calvin Souther Fuller	1902	Silicon solar cell	
2008	Clarence Johnson	1910	Fighter jet, afterburning means for Turbojet	
2008	Daryl Chapin	1906	Silicon solar cell	
2008	David Pall	1914	Filtration technology	
2008	Erna Schneider Hoover	1926	Computerized telephone switching	
2008	Gerald Pearson	1905	Silicon solar cell	
2008	Harold McMaster	1916	Tempered glass	
2008	John Charnley	1911	Acetabular socket	
2008	Kenneth Richardson	1939	Fluconazole	
2008	Louis Stevens	1925	Magnetic disk storage	
2008	Malcom McLean	1913	Shipping containers	
2008	Ray McIntire	1918	Styrofoam	
2008	Robert Adler	1913	Television remote control	
2008	Ruth R. Benerito	1916	Wrinkle-free cotton	
2008	Willem Einthoven	1860	Electrocardiograph	
2008	William P. Murphy Jr.	1923	Blood bag and disposable medical trays	
2008	Amos E. Joel Jr.*	1918	Mobile communication system	
2008	Nick Holonyak*	1928	visible light emitting diode	
2009	Bob Widlar	1937	Linear integrated circuit	
2009	Carver Mead	1934	Very large scale integration (VLSI)	
2009	Dawon Kahng	1931	Electric field controlled semiconductor device, MOSFET transistor	
2009	Dov Frohman	1939	Erasable programmable read only memory array (EPROM)	
2009	Frank Wanlass	1933	Complementary metal–oxide–semiconductor (CMOS)	
2009	Jean Hoerni	1924	Planar manufacturing process	
2009	John MacDougall	1940	Ion implantation	
2009	Ken Manchester	1925	Ion implantation	
2009	Larry J. Hornbeck	1943	Spatial light modulator and method	
2009	Mohamed M. Atalla	1924	MOSFET transistor, silicon semiconductor surface passivation, ATM PIN security system	
2009	Ross Freeman	1948	Field-programmable gate array (FPGA)	
2009	Alfred Y. Cho*	1937	Molecular beam epitaxy	
2009	George H. Heilmeier*	1936	Electro-optic liquid crystal device	
2009	Gordon Kidd Teal*	1907	Silicon transistor	
2009	Gordon Moore*	1929	Semiconductor production	
2010	Arthur Fry	1931	Post-it notes	
2010	Émile Gagnan	1900	Aqua-lung diving equipment	
2010	Field H. Winslow	1916	Polymer cable sheath	
2010	Francis P. Bundy	1910	Diamond synthesis	
2010	Herbert M. Strong	1908	Synthetic diamond	
2010	Jacques Cousteau	1910	Diving unit	
2010	Judah Folkman	1933	Angiogenesis inhibition	
2010	Ralph Baer	1922	Video game console	
2010	Robert H. Wentorf Jr.	1926	Synthetic diamond	
2010	Roger L. Easton	1921	TIMATION satellite navigation system	
2010	S. Donald Stookey	1915	Glass ceramics	
2010	Spencer Silver	1941	Post-it notes	
2010	Tracy Hall	1919	Synthetic diamond	
2010	Vincent Lanza	1922	Polymer cable sheath	
2010	Walter Lincoln Hawkins	1911	Polymer cable sheath	
2010	Yvonne Brill	1924	Electrothermal hydrazine resistojet	
2011	Albert Dick	1856	Duplicating machine	
2011	Bernard Silver	1924	First optically scanned barcode	
2011	Carl Auer von Welsbach	1858	Improvements to gas lighting	
2011	Carleton Ellis	1876	Margarine	
2011	Charles Francis Jenkins	1867	Movie projector	
2011	Clarence Kemp	c. 1860	Solar water heater	
2011	Eadweard Muybridge	1830	Stop action photography	
2011	Edwin Binney	1866	Carbon black manufacturing	
2011	Eric Fossum	1957	CMOS active pixel image sensor camera-on-a-chip	
2011	Esther Sans Takeuchi	1953	Lithium/silver-vanadium oxide battery	
2011	Eugene Sullivan	1872	Borosilicate glass	
2011	François Hennebique	1842	Reinforced concrete construction	
2011	Frederic Eugene Ives	1856	Color photography	
2011	Gary K. Michelson	1949	Spinal surgical devices	
2011	George Ashley Campbell	1870	Loading coil	
2011	George Devol	1912	Industrial robot	
2011	Hannibal Goodwin	1822	Transparent flexible nitrocellulose	
2011	Henry F. Phillips	1890	Phillips screw	
2011	Henry M. Leland	1843	Interchangeable parts for automobiles	
2011	James Ritty	1836	Cash register	
2011	John Hays Hammond Jr.	1888	Radio control	
2011	John Ritty	1834	Cash register	
2011	Martin Hellman	1945	Public-key cryptography	
2011	Mary Anderson	1866	Windshield wiper	
2011	Mihajlo Pupin	1858	Loading coil	
2011	Norman Joseph Woodland	1921	First optically scanned barcode	
2011	Peter Cooper Hewitt	1861	Mercury-vapor lamp	
2011	Ralph Merkle	1952	Public-key cryptography	
2011	Rollin H. White	1872	Flash boiler for generating steam-controlled differential steering	
2011	Stanley Macomber	1887	Open web steel joist	
2011	Steven Sasson	1950	Digital camera	
2011	Thomas A. Watson	1854	Improvements to telephone	
2011	Thomas E. Murray	1860	Early power generation	
2011	Thomas Armat	1866	Movie projector	
2011	Valdemar Poulsen	1869	Magnetic wire recorder	
2011	Wallace Clement Sabine	1868	Architectural acoustics	
2011	Walther Nernst	1864	Metallic filament incandescent lamp	
2011	Warren Marrison	1896	Quartz clock	
2011	Whitfield Diffie	1944	Public-key cryptography	
2012	Akira Endo	1933	Mevastatin	
2012	Alejandro Zaffaroni	1923	Drug delivery systems	
2012	Barbara Liskov	1939	Programming Languages and System Design	
2012	David A. Thompson	1940	Thin film magnetic heads	
2012	Gary Starkweather	1938	Laser printer	
2012	Lubomyr Romankiw	1931	Thin film magnetic heads	
2012	Steve Jobs	1955	Personal computer, mobile phone, animated movie, digital publishing	
2012	C. Kumar N. Patel*	1938	Carbon dioxide laser	
2012	Dennis Gabor*	1900	Electron holography	
2012	Mária Telkes*	1900	Solar thermal storage system	
2013	Alfred Loomis	1887	Long range navigation system (LORAN)	
2013	Andrew Viterbi	1935	Code-division multiple access (CDMA)	
2013	Aran Safir	1926	Iris recognition algorithm	
2013	Arthur Ashkin	1922	Optical trapping	
2013	Donald Bitzer	1934	Plasma display	
2013	Garrett Brown	1942	Steadicam camera stabilizer	
2013	Grote Reber	1911	Radio telescope	
2013	H. Gene Slottow	1921	Plasma display	
2013	Irwin M. Jacobs	1933	Code-division multiple access (CDMA)	
2013	John Birden	1918	Radioisotope thermoelectric generator	
2013	John Daugman	1954	Iris recognition algorithm	
2013	Joseph Lechleider	1933	Digital subscriber line (DSL)	
2013	Kenneth Jordan	1921	Radioisotope thermoelectric generator	
2013	Leonard Flom	1927	Iris recognition algorithm	
2013	Robert H. Willson	1936	Plasma display	
2013	Robert Moog	1934	Moog synthesizer	
2013	Samuel W. Alderson	1914	Crash test dummy	
2014	Ashok Gadgil	1950	Water disinfection	
2014	Benjamin Durfee	1897	Automatic sequence controlled calculator (Harvard Mark I)	
2014	Bill Bowerman	1911	Modern athletic shoe	
2014	Chuck Hull	1939	Stereolithography	
2014	Clair Lake	1888	Automatic sequence controlled calculator (Harvard Mark I)	
2014	David Crosthwait	1898	Heating and ventilation system	
2014	Frances Arnold	1956	Evolution of enzymes	
2014	Francis E. Hamilton	1898	Automatic sequence controlled calculator (Harvard Mark I)	
2014	George Antheil	1900	Frequency-hopping spread spectrum	
2014	Hedy Lamarr	1914	Frequency-hopping spread spectrum	
2014	Howard Aiken	1900	Automatic sequence controlled calculator (Harvard Mark I)	
2014	Mildred Dresselhaus	1930	Lattice structure	
2014	Otis Boykin	1920	Electrical resistor	
2014	Richard DiMarchi	1952	Insulin Lispro	
2014	Willis Whitfield	1919	Clean room	
2015	Charles R. Drew	1904	Surgical needle	
2015	Edith Clarke	1883	Graphical calculator	
2015	Gary D. Sharp	1962	Polarization-control technology	
2015	George Edward Alcorn Jr.	1940	X-ray spectrometer	
2015	Ioannis Yannas	1935	Artificial skin	
2015	Jaap Haartsen	1963	Bluetooth wireless technology	
2015	John F. Burke	1922	Artificial skin	
2015	Kristina M. Johnson	1957	Polarization-control technology	
2015	Marion Donovan	1917	Waterproof diaper cover	
2015	Mary-Dell Chilton	1939	Transgenic plant	
2015	Paul B. MacCready	1925	Gossamer Condor	
2015	Shuji Nakamura	1954	Blue LED	
2015	Stanford R. Ovshinsky	1922	Nickel-metal hydride battery	
2015	Thomas Jennings	1791	Dry scouring	
2016	Bantval Jayant Baliga	1948	Insulated-gate bipolar transistor (IGBT)	
2016	Barrett Comiskey	1975	Electronic ink	
2016	Harriet Strong	1844	Water storage and flood control	
2016	Ivan Sutherland	1938	Display windowing by clipping	
2016	JD Albert	1975	Electronic ink	
2016	John Silliker	1922	Microbiological food safety and testing	
2016	Joseph Jacobson	1965	Electronic ink	
2016	Per-Ingvar Brånemark	1929	Dental implant	
2016	Radia Perlman	1951	Network routing and bridging	
2016	Robert M. Thomas	1908	Butyl rubber	
2016	Roger Angel	1941	Telescope mirror cell	
2016	Roger Bacon	1926	Carbon fibers	
2016	Sheldon Kaplan	1939	Auto-injector	
2016	Victor Lawrence	1945	Signal processing in telecommunications	
2016	Welton Taylor	1919	Microbiological food safety and testing	
2016	William Sparks	1905	Butyl rubber	
2017	Allene Jeanes	1906	Dextran production; xanthan gum	
2017	Augustine Sackett	1841	Drywall	
2017	Beatrice Hicks	1919	Device for sensing gas density	
2017	Carolyn Bertozzi	1966	Bioorthogonal Chemistry	
2017	Daniel Lewin	1970	Content delivery network	
2017	Don Arney	1947	Bambi Bucket for aerial firefighting	
2017	Earle Dickson	1892	Band-Aid self-adhesive bandages	
2017	Eli Harari	1945	Floating-gate EEPROM	
2017	Frances Ligler	1951	Portable optical air sensor	
2017	Haren S. Gandhi	1941	Automotive exhaust catalyst	
2017	Harold E. Froehlich	1922	Deep-sea submersible	
2017	Howard Head	1914	Laminated ski; oversized tennis racket	
2017	Iver Anderson	1953	Lead-free solder	
2017	Marshall Jones	1941	Industrial laser	
2017	Tom Leighton	1956	Content delivery network	
2018	Adi Shamir	1952	RSA cryptography	
2018	Arogyaswami Paulraj	1944	MIMO wireless technology	
2018	Ching W. Tang	1947	Organic light-emitting diode (OLED)	
2018	Howard S. Jones	1921	Conformal antenna	
2018	Jacqueline Quinn	1967	EZVI (Emulsified Zerovalent iron)	
2018	Joseph Shivers	1920	LYCRA fiber (Spandex)	
2018	Leonard Adleman	1945	RSA cryptography	
2018	Marvin H. Caruthers	1940	Chemical synthesis of DNA	
2018	Mary Engle Pennington	1872	Food preservation and food storage	
2018	Paul Terasaki	1929	Tissue typing for organ transplants, Terasaki tray	
2018	Ronald Rivest	1947	RSA cryptography	
2018	Stan Honey	1955	Sports broadcast graphic enhancements	
2018	Steven Van Slyke	1956	Organic light-emitting diode (OLED)	
2018	Sumita Mitra	1949	Nanocomposite dental materials	
2018	Warren S. Johnson	1847	Temperature control	
2019	Alonzo G. Decker Jr.	1884	Portable hand-held electric drill	
2019	Andrew Higgins	1886	Landing Craft Vehicle Personnel (LCVP)	
2019	Chieko Asakawa	1958	Home Page Reader	
2019	David Wait	1953	Microarray	
2019	Dennis Ritchie	1941	UNIX operating system	
2019	Edmund O. Schweitzer III	1947	Digital protective relay	
2019	Frederick Novello	1916	Thiazide diuretics (Chlorothiazide)	
2019	James Sprague	1909	Thiazide diuretics (Chlorothiazide)	
2019	James Truchard	1943	LabVIEW	
2019	Jeff Kodosky	1949	LabVIEW	
2019	John Baer	1917	Thiazide diuretics (Chlorothiazide)	
2019	Joseph C. Muhler	1923	Stannous fluoride toothpaste	
2019	Joseph Lee	1849	Bread machine	
2019	Karl H. Beyer Jr.	1914	Thiazide diuretics (Chlorothiazide)	
2019	Ken Thompson	1943	UNIX operating system	
2019	Rebecca Richards-Kortum	1964	Medical devices for low-resource settings	
2019	S. Duncan Black	1883	Portable hand-held electric drill	
2019	William J. Warner	1955	Digital non-linear editing system	
2019	William Nebergall	1914	Stannous fluoride toothpaste	
2020	Dana Bookbinder	1956	Bend-insensitive optical fiber	
2020	Edward W. Bullard	1893	Hard hat	
2020	Edward Sisler	1930	1-Methylcyclopropene (1-MCP)	
2020	Evelyn Berezin	1925	Computer systems for business use	
2020	Floyd Smith	1884	Modern parachute	
2020	Frank Zybach	1894	Center-pivot irrigation	
2020	Harry Cameron	1872	Blowout preventer (BOP)	
2020	Hinda Miller	1950	Sports bra	
2020	James Abercrombie	1891	Blowout preventer (BOP)	
2020	James McEwen	1948	Automatic surgical tourniquet	
2020	John Nicholson	1925	Ibuprofen	
2020	Lisa Lindahl	1948	Sports bra	
2020	Margaret Wu	1950	Synthetic lubricants	
2020	Mick Mountz	1965	Mobile robotic material handling	
2020	Ming-Jun Li	1959	Bend-insensitive optical fiber	
2020	Peter Wurman	1965	Mobile robotic material handling	
2020	Polly Smith	1949	Sports bra	
2020	Pushkar Tandon	1967	Bend-insensitive optical fiber	
2020	R. Rox Anderson	1950	Laser dermatology	
2020	Raffaelo D'Andrea	1967	Mobile robotic material handling	
2020	Stewart Adams	1923	Ibuprofen	
2020	Sylvia Blankenship	1954	1-Methylcyclopropene (1-MCP)	
2022	Carl Benz	1844	Automobile	
2022	James Buchanan Eads	1820	Steamboat	
2022	Lonnie Johnson	1949	Super Soaker	
2022	Marian Croak	1955	VoIP	
2022	Patricia Bath	1942	Cataract surgery	
2023	Angela Hartley Brodie	1934	Steroidal aromatase inhibitors	
2023	Cyril Keller	1922	Skid-steer loader	
2023	Drew Weissman	1959	Messenger RNA	
2023	Emmanuelle Charpentier	1968	CRISPR gene editing	
2023	James A. Parsons Jr.	1900	Alloy 20	
2023	Jennifer Doudna	1964	CRISPR gene editing	
2023	Katalin Karikó	1955	Messenger RNA	
2023	Louis Keller	1923	Skid-steer loader	
2023	Luis von Ahn	1978	reCAPTCHA	
2023	Lynn Conway	1938	Very Large Scale Integration	
2023	Marjorie Stewart Joyner	1896	Permanent wave machine	
2023	Philippe Horvath	1970	CRISPR gene editing	
2023	Robert Bryant	1962	Langley Research Center-Soluble Imide	
2023	Rodolphe Barrangou	1975	CRISPR gene editing	
2023	Roger Tsien	1952	Green fluorescent protein	
2023	Rory Cooper	1959	Wheelchair	
2024	James P. Allison	1948	Immune Checkpoint Blockade Therapy	
2024	Shankar Balasubramanian	1966	Sequencing-by-Synthesis, a DNA Sequencing method	
2024	David Klenerman	1959	Sequencing-by-Synthesis, a DNA Sequencing method	
2024	Eric Betzig	1960	Photoactivated Localization Microscopy	
2024	Harald Hess	1955	Photoactivated Localization Microscopy	
2024	Joseph-Armand Bombardier	1907	Ski-Doo Snowmobile	
2024	Andrea Goldsmith (engineer)	1964	Adaptive Beamforming for Multi-Antenna Wi-Fi	
2024	Asad M. Madni*	1947	MEMS (Micro-Electro-Mechanical Systems) GyroChip	
2024	George Washington Murray	1853	Agricultural Machinery	
2024	Mary Florence Potts	1850	Cold-Handle Sad Iron	
2024	Lanny Smoot	1955	Theatrical Technologies, Special Effects	
2024	Alice Mary Stoll	1917	Fire-Resistant Fibers, Fabrics	
2024	Takamine Jōkichi	1854	Adrenaline (epinephrine)	
2024	Ralph Teetor	1890	Cruise control	
2024	Xiaowei Zhuang	1972	Stochastic optical reconstruction microscopy	
2025	John R. Adler	1954	CyberKnife® Stereotactic Radiosurgery	
2025	Karl Bacon	1910	Tubular Steel Track Roller Coaster	
2025	Edgar (Ed) Morgan	1915	Tubular Steel Track Roller Coaster	
2025	Tom Blake (surfer)	1902	Surfboard Design	
2025	Emil J. Freireich	1927	Continuous-Flow Blood Cell Separator	
2025	George Judson	1925	Continuous-Flow Blood Cell Separator	
2025	James Fujimoto	1957	Optical Coherence Tomography	
2025	David Huang (ophthalmologist)	1964	Optical Coherence Tomography	
2025	Eric A. Swanson	1960	Optical Coherence Tomography	
2025	Barney S. Graham	1953	Structure-Based Vaccine Design	
2025	Jason McLellan	1981	Structure-Based Vaccine Design	
2025	Kerrie Holley	1954	Service-Oriented Architecture	
2025	Virginia Holsinger	1937	Dairy Product Innovations	
2025	Pamela Marrone	1956	Biological pest control	
2025	Virginia Norwood	1927	Multispectral Scanner	
2025	Charles Richard Patterson	1833	Carriages	
2025	Richard Schatz	1952	Palmaz-Schatz Coronary Stent	
