= Louis Parker =

Louis Parker may refer to:

- Louis N. Parker (1852–1944), English dramatist, composer and translator
- Louis W. Parker (1906–1993), Hungarian-American inventor
