= Fluorescein isothiocyanate =

5-FITC
6-FITC

Names
- Other names FITC; 5-Isomer: Fluorescein 5-isothiocyanate; Fluorescein isothiocyanate isomer I; 5-FITC; FITC-I; 6-Isomer: Fluorescein 6-isothiocyanate; Fluorescein isothiocyanate isomer II; 6-FITC; FITC-II

Identifiers
CAS Number	27072-45-3 (mixture); 3326-32-7 (5-isomer); 18861-78-4 (6-isomer)
3D model (JSmol)	Interactive image; Interactive image
ChEBI	CHEBI:37928
ChemSpider	17686 (5-isomer); 2043359 (6-isomer)
ECHA InfoCard	100.043.810
MeSH	Fluorescein+isothiocyanate
PubChem CID	131730176 (mix); 18730 (5-isomer); 2762652 (6-isomer)
UNII	7BUU93N0HM; I223NX31W9 (5-isomer); 360X6ZS9ZB (6-isomer)
CompTox Dashboard (EPA)	DTXSID4049408
- InChI: InChI=1S/C21H11NO5S/c23-12-2-5-16-18(8-12)26-19-9-13(24)3-6-17(19)21(16)15-4-1-11(22-10-28)7-14(15)20(25)27-21/h1-9,23-24H Key: MHMNJMPURVTYEJ-UHFFFAOYSA-N; InChI=1S/C21H11NO5S/c23-12-2-5-15-18(8-12)26-19-9-13(24)3-6-16(19)21(15)17-7-11(22-10-28)1-4-14(17)20(25)27-21/h1-9,23-24H Key: GTQFZXYECNSNNC-UHFFFAOYSA-N
- SMILES: c1cc2c(cc1N=C=S)C(=O)OC23c4ccc(cc4Oc5c3ccc(c5)O)O; c1cc2c(cc1N=C=S)C3(c4ccc(cc4Oc5c3ccc(c5)O)O)OC2=O

Properties
Chemical formula	C_{21}H_{11}NO_{5}S
Molar mass	389.38 g·mol^{−1}
Density	1.542 g/mL
- Except where otherwise noted, data are given for materials in their standard state (at 25 °C [77 °F], 100 kPa). verify (what is ?) Infobox references

Fluorescein isothiocyanate (FITC) is a derivative of fluorescein used in wide-ranging applications including flow cytometry. First described in 1942, FITC is the original fluorescein molecule functionalized with an isothiocyanate reactive group (−N=C=S), replacing a hydrogen atom on the bottom ring of the structure. It is typically available as a mixture of isomers, fluorescein 5-isothiocyanate (5-FITC) and fluorescein 6-isothiocyanate (6-FITC). FITC is reactive towards nucleophiles including amine and sulfhydryl groups on proteins. It was synthesized by Robert Seiwald and Joseph Burckhalter in 1958.

A succinimidyl-ester functional group attached to the fluorescein core, creating "NHS-fluorescein", forms another common amine reactive derivative that has much greater specificity toward primary amines in the presence of other nucleophiles.

FITC has excitation and emission spectrum peak wavelengths of approximately 495 nm and 519 nm, giving it a green color. Like most fluorochromes, it is prone to photobleaching. Due to the problem of photobleaching, derivatives of fluorescein such as Alexa 488 and DyLight 488 have been tailored for various chemical and biological applications where greater photostability, higher fluorescence intensity, or different attachment groups are needed. In addition, some experiments make use of FITC's propensity for photobleaching in order to measure proteins' lateral mobility in membranes, through the technique of fluorescence recovery after photobleaching.
