= NIHF =

NIHF is an abbreviation and may refer to:

- National Inventors Hall of Fame – a not-for-profit organization in the United States that recognizes important inventors and their contributions
  - List of National Inventors Hall of Fame inductees
- Norwegian Ice Hockey Federation – the governing body of all ice hockey, sledge hockey and in-line hockey in Norway
