= Walter Lincoln Hawkins =

American chemist and engineer

- Born: March 21, 1911; Washington D.C.
- Died: August 20, 1992 (aged 81); San Marcos, California
- Education: Rensselaer Polytechnic Institute, Howard University, McGill University (PhD 1938)
- Known for: Polymer chemistry
- Spouse: Lilyan (née Bobo) (m. 1938)
- Awards: National Medal of Technology
- Scientific career
- Fields: Chemistry, engineering
- Workplaces: McGill University, Columbia University, Bell Laboratories

Walter Lincoln Hawkins (March 21, 1911 – August 20, 1992) was an American chemist and engineer widely regarded as a pioneer of polymer chemistry. For thirty-four years he worked at Bell Laboratories, where he was instrumental in designing a long-lasting plastic to sheath telephone cables, enabling the introduction of telephone services to thousands of Americans, especially those in rural communities. In addition to his pioneering research, Hawkins is also known for his advocacy efforts for minority students. He also served as the chairman of Montclair State University in 1973. Amongst his many awards, Hawkins was the first African-American to be elected to the National Academy of Engineering (1975), and, shortly before his death in 1992, he was awarded the National Medal of Technology by then-U.S. president, George H. W. Bush.

== Early years ==
W. Lincoln Hawkins was born on March 21, 1911, in Washington, D.C. His father was a lawyer for the U.S. Census Bureau and his mother was a science teacher in the District of Columbia school system. Hawkins also had a brother, David Brown, and a sister. He was the grandson of a slave and obtained his secondary school education in the segregated school system of the Jim Crow Era.

When he was young, Hawkins was very interested in how things worked. For example, it was not unusual for him to take apart a single toy and reassemble it to make another one. He also made spring-driven toy boats to sail in the reflecting pool in front of the Lincoln Memorial. Hawkins and a fellow eleven-year-old once tried to build a perpetual motion machine, not realizing that it was an impossible task. He built a working radio so he could listen to Washington Senators baseball games.

While at Washington's Dunbar High School, Hawkins noticed that his physics teacher drove an expensive new car every year. The teacher, Dr. James Cowen, who had invented a self-starter mechanism to replace automobile hand cranks, received a new car each year as partial payment from the company which had bought the mechanism. Hawkins was tremendously excited to discover that a person could make a living through mechanical tinkering.

After graduating from high school he went to Rensselaer Polytechnic Institute in Troy, New York, where he was one of only 2 Black students at the school. In 1932 he graduated with B.S., in chemical engineering. Unable to find a job during the Great Depression, he enrolled in graduate school at Howard University where, in 1934, he earned a master's degree in chemistry. Professor Howard Blatt, Hawkins' friend and mentor at Howard, informed him of a special scholarship at McGill University in Montreal, Canada. Hawkins enrolled at McGill, earned his Doctorate in Chemistry in 1938, with a focus in cellulose (lignin) chemistry. He stayed at McGill to teach for several more years. In 1940, Hawkins left McGill to continue his research at Columbia University when he received a fellowship from the National Research Council.

Hawkins married his wife, Lilyan (née Bobo), in 1938; they remained married until his death in 1992. They had two sons.

=== Bell Laboratories ===
In 1942, Hawkins became the first African American person to join the technical staff of Bell Laboratories. In 1963, he became Bell Labs' Supervisor of Applied Research, and in 1972, the head of his department. His earliest projects at Bell Labs were focused on producing cheap alternatives to rubber that could be made domestically during World War II. By controlling much of the Pacific theater in World War II, the Japanese had cut off much of America's rubber supply from Southeast Asia. Hawkins contributed to the development of a rubber substitute made from petroleum stock.

After the war, Hawkins began work on new and improved insulation for telephone cables. Prior to this work, underground and underwater cables, which were laid over incredibly long distances, were covered with fiber wrapped in heavy, expensive lead sheathing. Scientists believed that new, cheap, lightweight plastics like polyethylene would be a good alternative, but common plastics could undergo chemical reactions that made them brittle and unsuitable for long-term use outdoors. Thus protective additives were required to stabilize these plastic materials. In 1956, Hawkins, in collaboration with Vincent Lanza, invented a plastic coating that could withstand extreme fluctuations in temperature, last up to seventy years, and was less expensive than lead. Upon validation of this technology, telephone lines were installed in rural areas, bringing affordable phone service to thousands of people and reducing the use of lead.

In addition to his technical efforts developing the new polymer-based cable sheath, Hawkins gave considerable effort to developing appropriate testing methods to prove the materials would have long lifetimes and minimal plastic waste, and towards communicating the underlying chemistry to non-technical audiences interested in the expansion of telecommunications technology. In the 1970s, Hawkins shifted his research focus towards minimizing plastic waste. His work in the area of recycling plastics continued after Hawkins was promoted to assistant director of Bell Labs' Chemical Research Lab in 1974. The extremely durable nature of plastic becomes a huge problem when it must be discarded. Hawkins became an expert, not only in making plastics last longer, but in recycling these seemingly indestructible products.

Over the course of his professional career, Hawkins contributed to 18 U.S. patents, 55 scientific research articles and 3 books.

=== Later years and advocacy efforts ===
Hawkins retired from Bell labs in 1976 after 34 years of contributions, and transitioned to working as the director of research of the Plastics Institute of America from 1976 to 1983.

Throughout his career, Hawkins was involved with minority advocacy efforts. Whilst working at Bell Labs, he helped establish the Bell Laboratories Summer Research Program for Minorities and Women in 1974, which benefited over 1,200 participants at the time of his death. Hawkins also helped establish and run the Bell Laboratories Cooperative Research Fellowship Program, which recruits and supports minorities and engineers interested in earning PhDs.. After retiring from Bell Labs, Hawkins continued to consult with the organization on diversity programming. After retirement, Hawkins began teaching and encouraging college students to study science and engineering. In 1981, he became the first chairman of Project SEED (Support of the Educationally & Economically Disadvantaged), an American Chemical Society program designed to promote science careers for minority students. He also served as chairman of the National Academy of Sciences/National Research Council Committee on Minorities in Engineering.

On August 20, 1992, Hawkins died in San Marcos, California due to heart failure. He was 81.

== Awards and legacy ==
Hawkins was frequently honored as a polymer chemistry pioneer. He was the first Black American to be hired as part of the technical staff of Bell Labs and subsequently the first African American to be elected to the National Academy of Engineering (1975). Hawkins also won the International Medal of the Society of Plastics, was inducted into the New Jersey Inventors Hall of Fame (1992), received the Burton C. Belden Award of the American Chemical Society, the Percy L. Julian Award of the National Organization of Black Chemists, the International Award of the Society of Plastics Engineers, the Honor Scroll of the American Institute of Chemists, and the Achievement Award of the Los Angeles Council of Black Professional Engineers. In a 1992 White House ceremony, he received the National Medal of Technology from President George H. W. Bush. Posthumously, Hawkins was inducted into the National Inventors Hall of Fame in 2010.

For his research contributions, he received honorary doctorates from Montclair State College, Stevens Institute of Technology, Kean State College, and Howard University.
