= Frances Ligler =

- Born: June 11, 1951
- Education: 2018, Honorary Doctorate, Furman University 2014, Honorary Doctorate, Agricultural University of Athens, Greece 2000, D.Sc. for Biosensor Technology, Oxford University 1977 D.Phil.. Biochemistry, Oxford University 1972 B.S. Biology-Chemistry, Furman University
- Alma mater: Furman University, Oxford University
- Known for: Optical biosensors
- Awards: 2022, American Chemical Society National Award in Analytical Chemistry 2020, National Academy of Engineering Simon Ramo Founders Award; 2017, National Inventors Hall of Fame; 2012, Presidential Rank of Meritorious Senior Professional, awarded by President Barack H. Obama; 2005, National Academy of Engineering, Bioengineering Section, Councillor 2014–2020; 2003, Presidential Rank of Distinguished Senior Professional, awarded by President George W. Bush; 2003, Christopher Columbus Foundation Homeland Security Award (Biological, Radiological, Nuclear Field) Elected Fellow: SPIE, AIMBE, AAAS, National Academy of Inventors
- Scientific career
- Fields: Biology, chemistry, biomedical engineering
- Workplaces: Dupont, Naval Research Laboratory, UNC Chapel Hill/North Carolina State University, Texas A&M University
- Website: https://engineering.tamu.edu/biomedical/profiles/ligler-frances.html

Frances S. Ligler (born June 11, 1951) is a biochemist and bioengineer who was a 2017 inductee of the National Inventors Hall of Fame. Ligler's research dramatically improved the effectiveness of biosensors while at the same time reducing their size and increasing automation. Her work on biosensors made it easier to detect toxins and pathogens in food, water, or when airborne.

In a 2017 interview, Ligler summarized her work: "Optical biosensors is a whole field where biological molecules are being used for recognition and transduce an optical signal to a small device. My teams and I demonstrated the use of optical biosensors for detection of pathogens in food, infectious diseases in people, biological warfare agents, environmental pollutants, explosives and drugs of abuse — things that can kill you." Ligler's interests include microfluidics, tissue on chips, optical analytical devices, biosensors and nanotechnology. Ligler holds 37 patents and has authored over 400 scientific papers.

== Biography ==
Ligler received a B.S. from Furman University and a D.Phil. and D.Sc. from Oxford University. In 1986, she joined the US Naval Research Laboratory, where she developed sensors to detect anthrax and botulinum toxin that were deployed during Operation Desert Storm.

In 2013, she left the US Naval Research Laboratory to become the Lampe Distinguished Professor of Biomedical Engineering in the Joint Department of Biomedical Engineering at North Carolina State University and the University of North Carolina at Chapel Hill. She received honorary doctorates from the Agricultural University of Athens, Greece in 2014 and from Furman University in 2018. In 2022, she became Professor and Eppright Chair in Biomedical Engineering at Texas A&M University.

== Awards and honors ==
- 1992, Office of National Drug Control Policy Technology Transfer Award for Drug Enforcement
- 1993, Hillebrand Prize, Chemical Society of Washington, D.C.
- 1997, U.S. Women in Science and Engineering (WISE) Scientific Achievement Award
- 2000, Fellow, SPIE
- 2000, Navy Superior Civilian Service Award
- 2003, Christopher Columbus Foundation Homeland Security Award (Biological, Radiological, Nuclear Field)
- 2003, Presidential Rank of Distinguished Senior Professional, awarded by President George W. Bush
- 2005, Elected Member, U.S. National Academy of Engineering
- 2006, Distinguished Furman Alumni of the 20th Century
- 2009, Partnership for Public Service's Service to America Medals Finalist, Career Achievement
- 2012, Presidential Rank of Meritorious Senior Professional, awarded by President Barack H. Obama
- 2012, Elected Fellow, American Institute for Medical and Biological Engineering
- 2013, Elected Fellow, American Association for the Advancement of Science
- 2014, Honorary doctorate, Agricultural University of Athens, Greece
- 2016, Carl Kohrt Distinguished Alumni Award, Furman University
- 2016, Elected Fellow, National Academy of Inventors
- 2017, Award for Distinguished Service in the Advancement of Analytical Chemistry, ACS Division of Analytical Chemistry
- 2017, Honorary Member, Hellenic Society for Nanotechnology in Health Sciences
- 2017, Inductee, National Inventors Hall of Fame
- 2018, Honorary doctorate, Furman University
- 2020, Simon Ramo Founders Award, National Academy of Engineering
- 2022, National Award in Analytical Chemistry, American Chemical Society
- 2023, Power List - Innovators and Trailblazers, the Analytical Scientist
- 2024, Power List - Instrumental Innovators, the Analytical Scientist
