= Jacqueline Quinn (engineer) =

American engineer and inventor

Jacqueline Williams Quinn
- Born: July 19, 1967 (age 59)
- Education: University of Central Florida; Georgia Tech
- Awards: National Inventors Hall of Fame
- Scientific career
- Workplaces: Kennedy Space Center

Jacqueline Quinn (born July 19, 1967) is an American engineer and inventor. She was one of the inventors of emulsified zerovalent iron, an environmentally safe material that can remove chlorinated solvent contaminants left from space exploration. She was inducted into the National Inventors Hall of Fame in 2018.

== Early life and education ==
Quinn was an undergraduate student at Georgia Tech. She moved to the University of Central Florida as a graduate student. Her doctoral research considered zerovalent permanent treatments using deep soil mixing and vitro-isolation. She has continued to work on environmental cleanup throughout her scientific career.

== Research and career ==
Quinn is an environmental engineer at NASA. In the early years of space exploration, NASA used chlorinated solvents to degrease rocket engine parts. The solvents, dense non-aqueous phase liquids (DNAPLS), cause environmental contamination at government facilities. As they are heavier than water, they can sink into the ground and pollute water sources. To tackle DNAPLS, Quinn invented emulsified zerovalent iron (EZVI), an innovative material which puts zerovalent iron into a surfactant-stabilized emulsion. The emulsion, which is biodegradable, can be injected into soil, and absorbs the contaminant into the emulsion. Once absorbed, the zerovalent iron in the emulsion breaks down the contaminant. EZVI was awarded the NASA Government Invention of the Year. Emulsified zerovalent iron has been used to decontaminate groundwater supplies at the Patrick Space Force Base, Cape Canaveral and Port Canaveral, and licensed to twelve different companies.

Quinn has also worked to remove polychlorinated biphenyl (PCBs), molecules that were historically added to paint to prevent it peeling, cracking or catching fire. PCBs are dangerous to animals and humans, and can damage both physical and mental health. In 2016, the United Nations declared PCBs the world's most widespread contaminants. Quinn and her colleagues developed a benign reagent that could be used to attract and trap the contaminants. She showed that by incorporating this reagent into a drinking straw it could be used to capture PCBs in water. Working with her team at NASA, the technology evolved into SPEARs (the Sorbent Polymer Extraction and Remediation System), which included a spike-shaped polymer tube.

Quinn is part of the Kennedy Space Center project Mass Spectrometer Observing Lunar Operations (MSolo), a project that is looking for water on the Moon. The project looks to convert commercially available mass spectrometers into devices that can be used to analyze molecules on Mars. MSolo will be included on the Polar Resources Ice Mining Experiment-1 (PRIME-1) mission, part of NASA's Commercial Lunar Payload Services.

Quinn was inducted into the National Inventors Hall of Fame in 2018.

== Selected publications ==
- Jacqueline Quinn; Cherie Geiger; Chris Clausen; et al. (March 1, 2005). "Field demonstration of DNAPL dehalogenation using emulsified zero-valent iron". Environmental Science & Technology. 39 (5): 1309–1318. doi:10.1021/es0490018. ISSN 0013-936X. PMID 15787371. Wikidata Q46314896.
- Hara, Suzanne O'; Krug, Thomas; Quinn, Jacqueline; Clausen, Christian; Geiger, Cherie (2006). "Field and laboratory evaluation of the treatment of DNAPL source zones using emulsified zero-valent iron". Remediation Journal. 16 (2): 35–56. Bibcode:2006RemJ...16b..35H. doi:10.1002/rem.20080. ISSN 1051-5658.
