= William Edward Hanford =

American chemist (1908–1996)

William Edward "Butch" Hanford
- Born: 9 December 1908; Bristol, Pennsylvania, U.S.
- Died: 27 January 1996 (aged 87); Bethesda, Maryland
- Education: Philadelphia College of Pharmacy and Science; University of Illinois
- Known for: Co-inventor of the process to develop multipurpose material polyurethane
- Awards: Chemical Pioneers Award (1967); American Institute of Chemists Gold Medal (1974); National Inventors Hall of Fame Inductee (1991)
- Scientific career
- Fields: Chemistry
- Workplaces: Rohm and Haas, DuPont, General Aniline and Film, M. W. Kellogg Company, Olin Corporation
- Doctoral advisor: Roger Adams

William Edward "Butch" Hanford (December 9, 1908 – January 27, 1996) was an American chemist who is best known for developing the modern process to make multipurpose material polyurethane. Hanford's most notable discovery occurred while working with fellow chemist Donald Fletcher Holmes at DuPont. On June 2, 1942, Hanford was awarded a patent for his process. Currently, this method is responsible for manufacturing many of the plastics that are used in medicine, the automotive industry, and consumer products. Hanford's later accomplishments included the development of the first liquid household detergent and a new kind of ammunition for Winchester-Western Company. For his work, Hanford was inducted into the National Inventors Hall of Fame in 1991. The New York Times has noted that Hanford's developments were "monumental."

== Early life ==
William Edward Hanford was born on December 9, 1908, in Bristol, Pennsylvania. His mother was Irene Laing Hanford, and she was born into considerable wealth. Although she came from an affluent family, Irene stayed at home and was responsible for her children's upbringing. Hanford's father was Thomas Cook Hanford. Thomas was originally from Philadelphia, but he later moved to Bristol where he met his wife. Before marrying Irene, Thomas worked as a bookkeeper for a living. As a young man, Thomas injured himself while lifting heavy objects which prevented him from becoming a traditional laborer. Thomas married Irene in Bristol, Pennsylvania, where the couple purchased a house and raised their family.

William Hanford was the second of three children. He was two years older than his youngest brother and two years younger than his oldest brother. During his childhood, Hanford's mother stressed the importance of religion and taught Hanford the value of hard work. Although his mother was raised with considerable wealth, Hanford himself had little money as a child. Having lived through World War I, he learned to make the most of his opportunities and take his education seriously.

== Education ==
Throughout his early education, Hanford focused primarily on his school work and sought to learn more about the scientific world around him. He graduated from Bristol High School in 1926. While attending high school, Hanford became interested in chemistry from his science teachers. Hanford's uncle was a pharmacist and also encouraged his nephew's interest in the subject.

Following his graduation, Hanford decided that he wanted to earn a college degree in chemistry, but he was unsure of which institution he should attend. Because Hanford's uncle was a pharmacist who had already graduated from the school, he suggested that his nephew should attend the Philadelphia College of Pharmacy and Science. At the time, the college had just opened a new chemistry division. This further sparked Hanford's interest in the school. Hanford's uncle agreed to pay for Hanford's tuition, so he enrolled in the school in 1926. His class had a total of seven students, and each student had some prior connection to the field of pharmacy. In 1930, Hanford graduated with a Bachelor of Science degree and took a job at Rohm and Haas with the help of his uncle.

After working for approximately eight months, Hanford left Rohm and Haas to go to graduate school. He had difficulty deciding between the Pennsylvania State University and the University of Illinois for his graduate studies, but he eventually enrolled at the University of Illinois. While at graduate school, he was mentored by Dr. Roger Adams. Hanford and Adams would remain lifelong friends after Hanford finished his graduate studies, and Adams would often advise Hanford about his career opportunities. While attending the University of Illinois, Hanford also met other notable chemists including Carl Marvel, Reynold Fuson, and Ralph Shriner. Similarly, he met his future colleague Donald Holmes who was also attending the university. In 1935, Hanford graduated with his Ph.D. in organic chemistry.

== Career ==
Soon after graduating from the University of Illinois, Hanford sought employment. He decided to turn down an offer to return to Rohm and Haas in favor of working for DuPont. It was Hanford's friend and future colleague Donald Holmes who got Hanford the job. Roger Adams told Hanford that he should work in the company's experimentation division. Once at DuPont, Hanford began to develop the processes that would win him numerous awards and allow him to hold over 120 patents.

In 1935, Hanford officially started working for DuPont. While working at the company, Hanford was given the freedom to explore the areas of research that interested him. He started to work with thiocyanates. These compounds were the main components in insecticides and lubricants. After approximately six months, Hanford was made a group leader and given two assistants. It was at this time that Hanford began to work on problems that other chemists could not solve. The first challenge Hanford faced was the need to polymerize caprolactam. He inherited the problem from famed chemist Wallace Carothers who was also working at DuPont at the time. Within a week, Hanford and his two assistants had found a solution that yielded ninety-six percent of Carothers’ desired polymer. Solving this problem furthered Hanford's interest in polyamides and polyesters. He soon began to work with di-isocyanates by studying reactions that contained hydroxyl, carboxyl, amide, and amine components.

On May 24, 1939, Hanford and Donald Holmes filed a patent titled “Process for Making Polymeric Products and for Modifying Polymeric Products.” This patent was the development that would eventually land Hanford in the Inventors Hall of Fame. After working at DuPont for three years, Hanford had devised a way to make polyurethane chains. His original inspiration came from a problem that fellow DuPont chemist Julian Werner Hill could not solve. Hill was trying to combine a number of polyols together, but he could not find a method to join them. Hill gave the challenge to Donald Holmes, but Holmes also could not solve the problem. While having lunch one day, Hanford asked Holmes how things were going. Holmes explained that he was getting nowhere, so Hanford suggested that Holmes should try using the di-isocyanates that Hanford had developed earlier. Following the meeting, Holmes took Hanford's advice and together they developed the modern process for making multipurpose material polyurethane. Hanford's understanding that polyols could be linked together with di-isocyanates allowed the two scientists to create their process. Three years after filing their original request, Hanford and Holmes were issued a patent for their process on June 2, 1942. The patent was assigned to DuPont.

Later in 1942, Hanford left DuPont and took a job at General Aniline and Film Corporation (GAF). At age thirty-four, Hanford was made the director of research for the entire company. While at GAF, Hanford worked to produce the first commercial liquid laundry detergent. In addition to working on the actual formula for the detergent, Hanford also designed a better plastic bottle to hold the new product. The new detergent was marketed under the name “Glim” and had moderate commercial success.

After working at GAF for four years, Hanford left the corporation to work for M. W. Kellogg Company in 1946. He considered M. W. Kellogg Company the “finest chemical engineering and petroleum company in the world,” and was soon made the director of petroleum and chemical research. In 1950, Hanford was named to the company's board of directors and was promoted to the vice president position. He was also made the director of research for the entire company. Hanford's research at the firm led to the discovery of a process that would lower the cost of ammonia production. He also worked on one of the first synthetic fuel projects by conducting research to derive gasoline from carbon monoxide, hydrogen, and coal.

After working at M. W. Kellogg Company for seven years, Hanford left the firm to explore other projects. In 1957, Hanford had the opportunity to work for either 3M (Minnesota Mining and Manufacturing Company) or Olin Corporation. Before making his decision, John Olin told Hanford, “You’ll be vice president of research... You’ll be in charge of all research in the entire corporation. That’s what you’re here for.”6 Hanford decided to work for Olin Corporation shortly after hearing this proposition. He soon got to work on a new kind of ammunition for Olin Corporation’s subsidiary, Winchester-Western Company. Hanford developed a plastic shotgun shell that was popular throughout the 1960s. The development utilized Hanford’s polyurethane process to strengthen the shell while cutting production costs. He later briefly experimented with different types of fuels for automobiles.

In 1973, Hanford retired from Olin Corporation to become a consultant for his son’s company, World Water Resources Incorporated. Hanford’s retirement from Olin Corporation marked the end of his career as a corporate chemist.

== Inventions ==
Hanford’s most notable development was his process for making material polyurethane. Although Hanford held over 120 patents before his death, these following two developments are some of his most notable achievements.

=== Process for Multipurpose Material Polyurethane ===
Hanford’s process was revolutionary because he discovered that di-isocyanates and existing polyols would join together into compounds very quickly. This discovery allowed polyurethane chains to be produced in greater numbers and at a lower cost than previously possible. Earlier German methods of polyurethane production needed time to cure and were not always dependable. Hanford’s process was simple, reliable, and able to produce polyurethane chains on an industrial scale. After making his discovery, Hanford was quoted as saying, “That invention took me seventeen minutes [to develop].” Similarly, the components needed to run Hanford's process were not difficult or expensive to obtain. Although he never worked on the mass production of polyurethane himself, Hanford's process was instrumental in creating the modern polyurethane manufacturing industry. His process is still used today for the production of most forms of polyurethane plastic and foam.

Currently, polyurethane is utilized extensively as a foam or varnish. Seats, dashboard instrument panels, headliners, and bumpers are common uses for polyurethane in automobiles. The solid wheels used on rollerblades, skateboards, and shopping carts are often entirely made of polyurethane. Modern medicine uses polyurethane for artificial heart valves and as a transparent varnish for many prosthetic devices. The construction industry uses polyurethane for insulation, molding, and other residential fixtures. Other identifiable uses for polyurethane include Wilson tennis grips, Seiko watch-bands, Gorilla Glue, and Excel Adhesive. It is unlikely that many of these products would have been manufactured on an industrial scale without Hanford's original process.

=== Mark 5 shotgun shell ===
In the early 1960s, Hanford developed the Mark 5 shotgun shell while working for Olin Corporation. At the time, he was researching for the Winchester-Western division of the company. Hanford incorporated the properties from his past developments into his new design. He was able to make a very thin plastic shell casing that reduced the weight of the ammunition and cut production costs. The new shell casing was formed almost entirely from plastic and had an additional polyurethane collar. The polyurethane collar kept the inside of the shotgun barrel cleaner than previous types of ammunition after prolonged firing. The collar also lessened the dispersion of the pellets when they left the barrel, thereby making the ammunition more effective for game hunting or sport shooting. Most importantly, the Mark 5 shotgun shell delivered greater force than competing types of ammunition without increasing a weapon's recoil strength. In March 1962, Winchester-Western Company began to sell the new ammunition to the public. Hanford's shell was highly popular because of its light weight and superior performance. Winchester-Western Company produced the Mark 5 shell in 12-gauge, 16-gauge, and 20-gauge sizes.

== Nickname ==
William Edward Hanford has often been referred to as “Butch” Hanford because of his appearance when working in the laboratory. While at the University of Illinois, Hanford often wore a dirty laboratory coat that was covered in chemicals. He would also cut the sleeves off of his coat to allow him to work more easily. His colleagues jokingly said that the only name that could characterize his appearance would be “Butch” because he resembled a butcher. After graduating from the University of Illinois, the nickname followed Hanford for the rest of his career.

== Later life and legacy ==
William Edward Hanford married his wife Lorraine as a young man. Together they had a son, William Edward Hanford Jr., who is currently a lawyer and owns World Water Resources Incorporated. The company seeks to provide water sterilization systems for developing countries.

Despite the acclaim and importance of Hanford's polyurethane production process, he received no additional compensation for his patent from DuPont. Hanford received a salary from the firm, but the company provided him with no additional payment because he was a corporate chemist. Likewise, Hanford's patent was assigned to DuPont, so he could not sell the rights to his discovery. He once remarked that he was never compensated beyond his regular salary for any of his 120 patents from any corporation. Furthermore, Hanford did not receive royalties for his developments either.

On January 27, 1996, William Edward Hanford died in Bethesda, Maryland. He was eighty-seven years old. Following his death, The New York Times published his obituary on January 31, 1996, and noted that his developments were “a tremendous breakthrough.” Hanford is survived by his wife, son, and two grandchildren.

== Awards ==
- Ambassador's Award, State of Pennsylvania, 1955
- Honor Scroll, American Institute of Chemists (New York Chapter), 1957
- Chemical Industry Medal, Society of Chemical Industry (American Section), 1961
- Chemical Pioneers Award, 1967
- Gold Medal, American Institute of Chemists, 1974
- Inducted into the National Inventors Hall of Fame, 1991
- Inducted in the Plastics Hall of Fame, 1996

== Key Patents ==
- Hanford, U.S. Patent 2,284,896, “Process For Making Polymeric Products And For Modifying Polymeric Products”
- Hanford, U.S. Patent 2,312,967, “Chemical Process and Product”
- Hanford and Salsberg, U.S. Patent 2,313,871, “Polythiourea”
- Christ and Hanford, U.S. Patent 2,333,917, “Coated Fabric”
- Hanford, U.S. Patent 2,407,419, “Stabilization Of Tetrafluoroethylene”
- Hanford, U.S. Patent 2,411,159, “Lubricant”
