= Robert Seiwald =

American chemist

Robert J. Seiwald (born March 26, 1925) is an American retired chemist. He was born in Fort Morgan, Morgan County, Colorado. An only child, his parents were farmers. His father died in 1934 of pneumonia, while his mother died of breast cancer in 1935. Prior to enlisting in the United States Army during World War II in 1944, he enrolled at the University of San Francisco, where he majored in chemistry. During the war, he was a rifleman in the 89th Infantry Division and went to Europe on a ship. In 1954, he studied for his Ph.D. at St. Louis University.

In 1960, Seiwald and Joseph H. Burckhalter received a patent while working at University of Kansas, for their work on fluorescein fluorescein isothiocyanate and rhodamine isothiocyanate, the former being an antibody labeling agent which helps accurately diagnosing various diseases. In 1957, he returned to the University of San Francisco as an organic chemistry professor, a position he held until his retirement in 1999. In 1995, Seiwald and Burckhalter were inducted into the National Inventors Hall of Fame.

== Personal life ==
Seiwald married Joan Walter in 1956. They were married until her death in on May 11, 2023, at the age of 91. The couple had five children in total.
