= Don Arney =

Canadian inventor and entrepreneur

Don Arney (born 1947) is a Canadian inventor and entrepreneur best known for inventing the Bambi Bucket, a collapsible helicopter bucket used for fighting forest fires.

Arney is the founder of SEI Industries, an industrial fabric product manufacturer which he started in 1978.

== Early life ==
Arney was born in Prince Rupert, British Columbia; he spent the first eight years of his life there before moving a number of times around Vancouver Island in order to accommodate his father's work in construction. In his youth, he spent time living in Port Alberni, Chemainus, Nanaimo and Victoria.

Arney attended Simon Fraser University and graduated with a Bachelors of Science in Biology.

== Career ==
Arney worked at a Vancouver shipyard, testing underwater airbags. Soon after, he moved to North Vancouver where he founded SEI industries in 1978 with Mark McCooey. He began work on what would be his best-known invention, the Bambi Bucket. SEI introduced the first iteration of the Bambi Bucket to firefighters in 1982. Its lightweight design and low price point made it a practical tool for fighting fires. The Bambi Bucket was officially unveiled at the Helicopters Association International trade show that same year. The Bambi Bucket continues to be used in firefighting around the world; they were used in 2011 to cool nuclear reactors in Japan after damage from a tsunami.

In 1984, SEI industries moved from North Vancouver to Richmond.

Arney continued to invent and acquire products with SEI Industries over the years. In 2002 he invented the HangBoard, a winter sports board that combines the experiences of snowboarding and hang gliding. While speeding downhill and manipulating steering rudders, the rider is suspended above the snow on a small folding crane. The invention has yet to be produced commercially.

== Meditation ==
Arney attributes much of his success as an inventor to his twice-daily practice of the Transcendental Meditation technique ("TM"), which he says has been a vital part of his routine for more than 50 years. He says, “TM is a simple, mental technique that allows the mind to settle down in a very profound way. It is scientifically verified and not based on a belief system. It has made a huge contribution to my creativity because, the more settled and relaxed my mind is, the more I can see opportunities that I would otherwise overlook.” He values the practical benefits of the practice to such an extent that he says, "At SEI we help sponsor any employees who want to learn the Transcendental Meditation program. It’s amazing to watch the resulting positive changes in their lives. Research shows that people who practice TM have, on average, 80% less heart disease, strokes and cancer. If our employees are healthier, they’re going to be happier and more productive; so it helps our business."

== Awards and accolades ==
In 2017, Arney was inducted into the National Inventors Hall of Fame at a ceremony in Washington, D.C. He was recognized for the life saving qualities of his invention the Bambi Bucket.

Arney has received the BC Export Award, which was awarded to his company SEI Industries in 2003, and an Ernest C. Manning Award, which he won in 1986.

In 2005, Arney was featured in the BC Almanac's Book of Greatest British Columbians.
