= James Ritty =

American inventor (1836–1918)

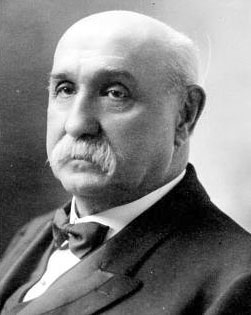
James Jacob Ritty

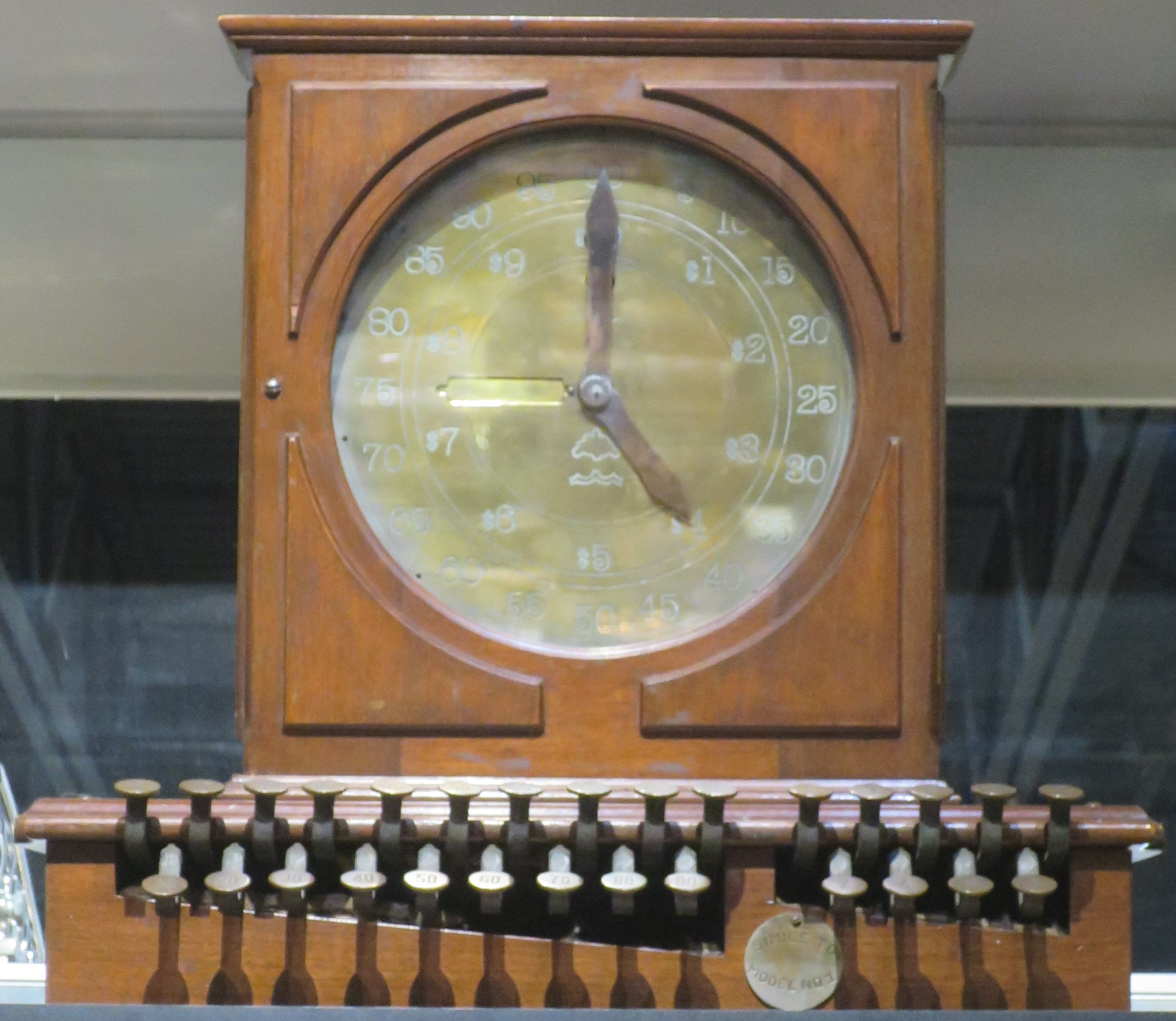
Reproduction of Ritty Dial, an early example of a practical cash register

James Jacob Ritty (29 October 1836 – 29 March 1918), saloonkeeper and inventor, is known as the inventor of one of the earliest cash registers.

James Ritty opened his first saloon in Dayton, Ohio, in 1871, billing himself as a "Dealer in Pure Whiskies, Fine Wines, and Cigars." It was his belief that some of his employees were taking customers' money that was meant to pay for food, drink, and other wares, and he desired a solution to prevent this embezzlement. In 1878, while on a steamboat trip to Europe, Ritty became intrigued by a mechanism that counted how many times the ship's propeller went around and wondered whether something such as this could be made to record the cash transactions made at his saloon.

As soon as he got home to Dayton, Ritty and his brother John, a skilled mechanic, began working on a design for such a device. After several failed prototypes, they created their third design, operated by pressing a key that represented a specific amount of money. There was no receipt printer and no cash drawer, and the machine simply added up the total sales made in a day on a dial display, with two hands representing dollars and cents. At the end of each day, the manager could compare the amount on the dial versus the money in the till and the money that had been in the till at the close of the previous day and thereby determine if any cash was missing.

James and John Ritty patented the design on November 4, 1879, as "Cash Register and Indicator." This was not the first cash register on the market, as indicated by the patent, which describes it as "Improvement in cash register and indicator."

The Rittys opened a small factory in Dayton to manufacture cash registers while still operating the saloon, eventually producing other models such as "Ritty's Incorruptible Cashier." The company did not prosper and in 1881, James Ritty became overwhelmed with the responsibilities of running two businesses, and sold all his interests in the cash register business. The buyers were a group of investors including Jacob H. Eckert of Cincinnati, a china and glassware salesman who formed the National Manufacturing Company, and John and Frank Patterson, who were then in the coal and railroad business. John H. Patterson became majority owner in 1884, when the company was renamed The National Cash Register Company.

Ritty was not resentful that he did not benefit much from his invention and maintained friendly relations with John H. Patterson and many times was invited to attend various NCR meetings and conferences.

James Ritty opened another saloon, the Pony House, in 1882 in a building on South Jefferson Street that was previously a school of French and English for young ladies. For the Pony House, Ritty commissioned woodcarvers from Barney and Smith Car Company to turn 5,400 pounds of Honduras mahogany into a bar. The fruit of their labors was a bar 12 feet (3.7 m) tall and 32 feet (9.8 m) wide. The initials JR adorn the center peak and the left and right sections are similar to the interior of a passenger railcar, with the giant mirrors set back about a foot with curved, hand-tooled leather-covered elements at the top and curved bezel mirror-encrusted sections on each side. When the Pony House building was torn down in 1967, the bar was saved and today is the bar at Jay's Seafood in Dayton.

James Ritty retired from the bar business in 1895. He died of heart trouble in his downtown Dayton Arcade residence. He is entombed with his wife Susan and his brother John (ca 1834–28 December 1913) at Dayton's Woodland Cemetery.
