= Margaret M. Wu =

Taiwanese-American industrial chemist and inventor

Margaret May-som Shaw Wu
- Born: July 28, 1950 (age 76); Taipei, Taiwan
- Education: National Taipei University of Technology (BS); University of Rochester (PhD)
- Awards: National Inventors Hall of Fame
- Scientific career
- Workplaces: Mobil; American Cyanamid
- Thesis: Photochemistry of cycloalkylacetones (1976)

Margaret May-som Shaw Wu (Chinese: 蕭美琛; born June 28, 1950) developed artificial lubricants that improved machine performance and extended protection. Today, her inventions are used in everything from car engines to big industrial machines. Born in 1950, Taiwanese-American Wu is an industrial chemist who has pioneered the development of polyalphaolefin (PAO), a major synthetic oil used in automotive lubricants. This results in improvement in engine performance and fuel efficiency while reducing environmental impact. She holds many U.S. patents and is recognized as one of the most influential lubricant chemists in the current generation. In 2020, she was also admitted into the National Inventors Hall of Fame.

== Early life and education ==
Wu was born and raised in Taipei, Taiwan. She grew up in a family that valued education, and her father, who was a meteorologist, often inspired her to explore problems and try new experiments. She decided to follow a path in science and studied chemical engineering, earning her bachelor's degree from the National Taipei University of Technology. By 1971, she had moved to the United States and was continuing her education at the University of Rochester in New York. There, she earned her master's and Ph.D. in physical organic chemistry, a field that studies the relationship between chemical structures and reactivity. This knowledge later helped her design synthetic lubricants.

== Research and career ==
Before working at Mobil Chemistry, she worked at American Cyanamid Company researching petrochemistry. At Mobil, she was part of the research team and eventually became Mobil’s first senior scientific advisor, the company's highest technical position. Wu conducted work on developing a new class of polyalphaolefin and designing a lubricant at the molecular level.

== Innovation: Fixing something broken ==
Traditional lubricants used in the automotive and industrial sectors had many drawbacks and disadvantages. Wu realized that the problem is inconsistent molecular structures, which are contributing to lower fuel efficiency and more frequent oil changes. She mentioned that the new product is special because its chemical structure is clean and organized. All the molecules are built evenly, without any extra or unwanted branches, resulting in a more precise structure and formula. She eventually developed the synthetic lubricant, the final form of a formulated product, with a refined molecular structure that performs much better than traditional lubricants.

As a chemist, Wu illustrated that synthetic lubricants are used for two reasons: to function under stress and to create economic advantage. Regular petroleum oils cannot handle conditions such as extreme temperatures or long service life. Her PAO development can remain stable under these stresses; it has extended oil life and enhanced performance at extreme temperatures. Because it can operate longer and under harsher conditions, it also creates economic advantage since it has a better energy efficiency with low maintenance costs.

== Impact ==
Wu’s creation spread throughout the automotive world and has become critical for modern engines to operate at high pressure. Her formulation improved engine performance, and her molecular design has become the standard practice in lubricant engineering. Many commercial synthetic oils, even premium automatic brands, have been traced to and inspired by Wu’s polyalphaolefin structures. Also, her synthetic lubricant has improved fuel economy on millions of vehicles, reduced gasoline emissions, and made it overall more environmentally friendly.

== Recognition and Awards ==
- 2007: ACS Award in Industrial Chemistry
- Research & Development Council of New Jersey: Edison Patent Award, 2014 and 2005
- National Academy of Engineering: Member, 2019
