= Charles J. Plank =

American chemist and inventor

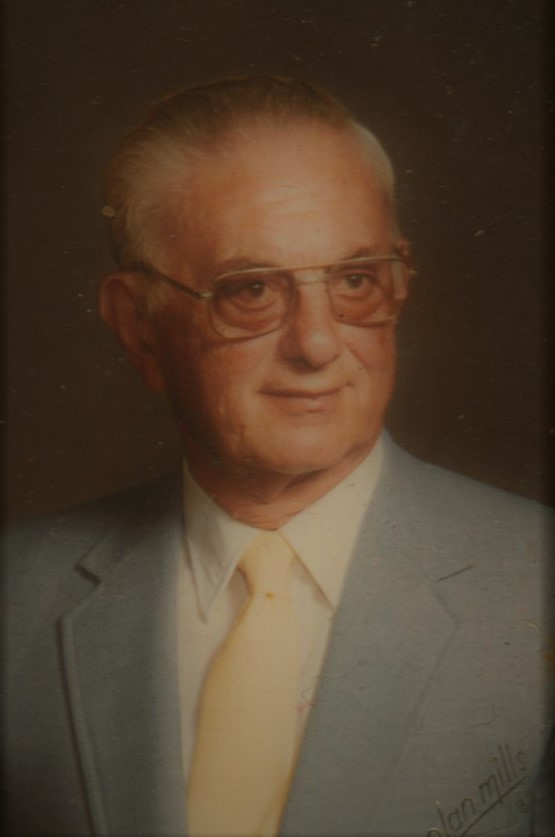
- Plank in 1983
- Born: Charles Joseph Plank; November 8, 1915; Calcutta, India
- Died: October 23, 1989 (aged 73); Woodbury, New Jersey
- Education: Purdue University
- Occupation: Former senior scientist (highest scientific post) at Mobil
- Known for: Inventor of the zeolite catalyst
- Spouse: Helen Eichel (m. 1941)

Charles Joseph Plank (November 8, 1915 – October 23, 1989) was a chemist and inventor, who patented the process of zeolite catalytic cracking of hydrocarbons. He is responsible for 83 U.S. patents and several hundred patents outside of the United States.

Plank was born in Calcutta, India, where his American parents were Methodist missionaries. As a child, he and his family returned to the United States, ultimately settling in Lafayette, Indiana. He graduated from Purdue University with a B.S. in chemistry, mathematics, and physics in 1936. Plank received his Ph.D. in physical chemistry in 1942, also from Purdue.

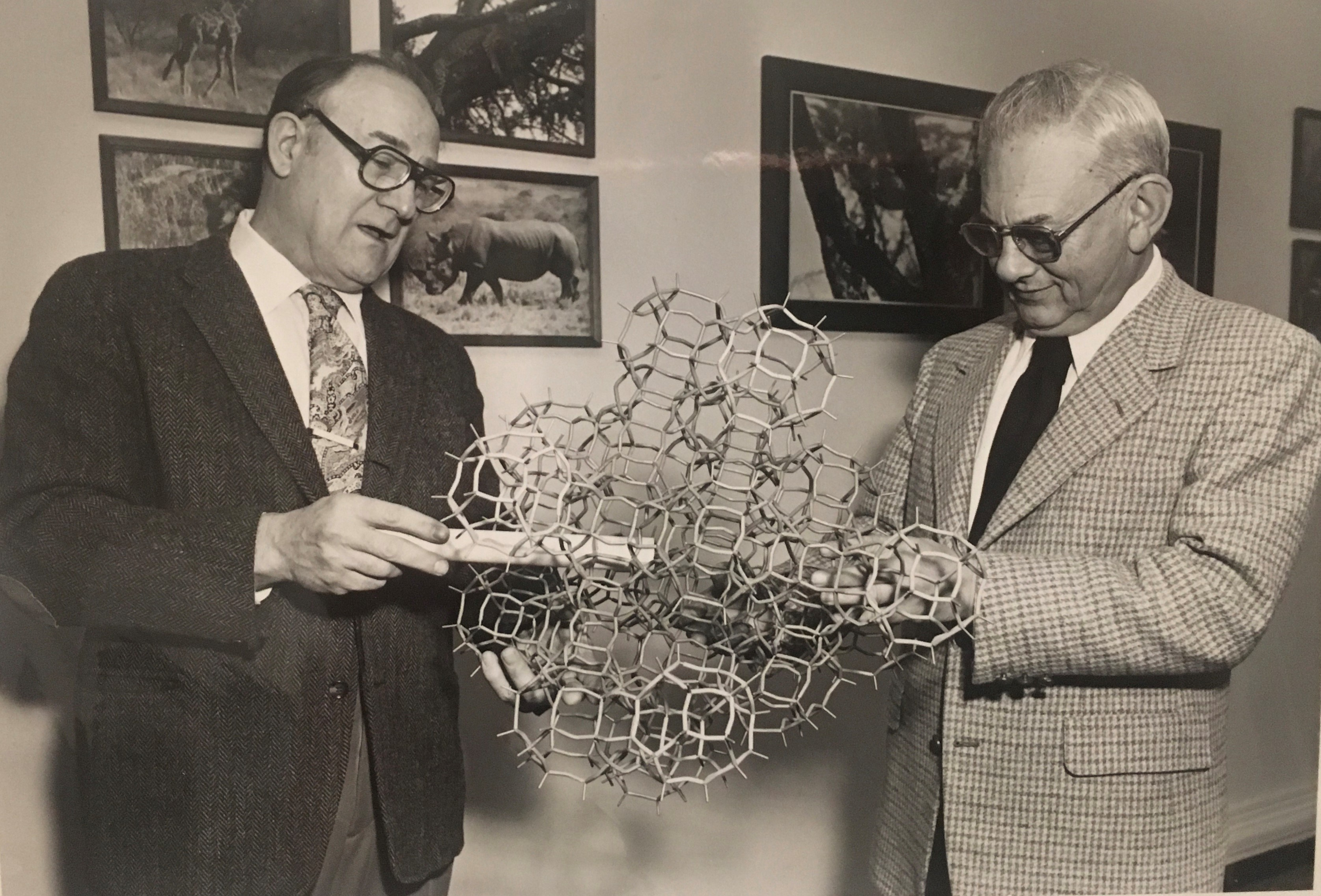
Plank (right) and Rosinski (left) demonstrating their invention prior to their induction into the National Inventors Hall of Fame, February 11, 1979

While researching catalysts for Mobil Oil in the 1950s, Plank and his chemical engineer partner Edward Rosinski came up with the idea to use zeolite, a porous clay-like material that contains microscopic channels approximately the same size as the desired hydrocarbon length for gasoline. The superior activity and selectivity of the zeolite catalysts led to dramatically higher gasoline yields. Additionally, the increased gas oil conversions could be obtained without increasing gas or coke yields, two of the unwanted byproducts of cracking.

On July 12, 1960, US Patent No. 3,140,249, Catalytic Cracking of Hydrocarbons with a Crystalline Zeolite Catalyst Composite was submitted and was officially patented on July 7, 1964. Mobil named it "Zeolite Y" and began using the process commercially in 1964.

In 1977, Plank was awarded an honorary Doctorate of Science from Purdue University for his contributions to the scientific community.

In 1979, Plank and Rosinski were inducted as the 30th and 31st members of the National Inventors Hall of Fame for US Patent No. 3,140,249, Catalytic Cracking of Hydrocarbons with a Crystalline Zeolite Catalyst Composite.

By the mid-1980s, about 35% of US gasoline was produced from zeolite catalytic cracking, saving the country an estimated 200 million barrels of oil per year. Today this process is now used in every major oil refinery in the world, saving consumers billions of dollars a year while extending the Earth's precious oil reserves.

Plank died from complications from prostate cancer on October 23, 1989, and was survived by his wife Helen, his son Larry, daughter Lois, and four grandchildren.
