= Pamela Marrone =

Serial entrepreneur in agriculture biotech

- Education: Cornell University; North Carolina State University
- Known for: Former CEO of Marrone Bio Innovation
- Spouse: Mick Rogers

Pamela Marrone is a serial entrepreneur in agriculture biotechnology and biological pesticides. She is one of 22 women who founded and led companies to be listed on public stock exchanges She held more than 500 patents. She also serves on a number of company boards and is on several advisory councils.

She currently lives in Davis, California with her husband, Mick Rogers.

== Early life and education ==
Marrone grow up in southern Connecticut. She received her bachelor of science in Entomology with honors and distinction from Cornell University in 1978 and a doctor of philosophy in Entomology with specialization from North Carolina State University 1983. She led the insect biology and control groups in Monsanto from 1983 to 1990 and was recruited by Novo Nordisk to start a biopesticide subsidiary.

== Career ==
=== Entotech, Inc ===
Marrone served as president and business unit head for Entotech, a Novo Nordisk subsidiary from 1990 to 1995 before it was sold to Abbott.

=== AgraQuest, Inc ===
Marrone founded AgraQuest in 1995. She served as CEO, chairman and President until 2006 when it was acquired by Bayer Crop Science for $425 million plus milestone payment.

=== Marrone Bio Innovations, Inc ===
Marrone founded Marrone Bio Innovations (NASDAQ: MBII), a pest management and plant health company in 2006. The company went public on NASDAQ in 2013. She stepped down as CEO in 2022.

=== Invasive Species Corporation and Invasive Species Research Institute ===
Marrone and former Marrone Bio Innovation president Jim Boyd launched Invasive Species Corporation and Invasive Species Research Institute in 2022.

== Award and recognition ==
Award	Orgranization	Year	Citation
IPM Innovator Award	California Department of Pesticide Regulation	2010	
Business Person of the Year	Sacramento Business Jorurnal	2013	
Best Manager with Stragetic Vision	Agrow	2014	
Sustie Award	Ecological Farming Association	2019	
Lifetime Achievement Award for Contribution in Biopesticides	BioAg World	2019	
Innovation in Chemistry of Agriculture	American Chemical Society	2019	
Most Admired CEO Distinguished Career Award	Sacramento Business Hornal	2020	
Kathryn Hach Award for Entrepreneurial Success	American Chemical Society	2022	
National Academy of Engineering Member	National Academy of Engineering	2024	
National Inventors Hall of Fame Inductee	National Inventors Hall of Fame	2025	
