= Frederick Ellsworth Sickels =

Frederick Ellsworth Sickels (September 20, 1819; Gloucester County, New Jersey – March 8, 1895; Kansas City) was an American inventor, best known for the invention of a cut-off valve for steam engines in 1841.

Sickels grew up in New York City, where his father was Chief Health Officer. After having worked for a year for the Harlem Railroad, he apprenticed at the age of 17 at the Allaire shops, where he developed a new type of steam cut-off valve for steam engines. He had perfected his invention by 1841.

Sickels obtained a patent for this invention, which he called 'Manner of constructing the apparatus for lifting, tripping, and regulating the closing of valves of steam engines' on March 20, 1842 (U.S. patent number 2631). Thurston (1878:317) relates "It was introduced by the inventor in a form which especially adapted it to use with the beam-engine used on the Eastern waters of the United States, and was adapted to stationary engines by Messrs. Thurston, Greene & Co., of Providence, R. I., who made use of it for some years before any other form of "drop cut-off" came into general use. The Sickels cut-off consisted of a set of steam-valves, usually independent of the exhaust-valves, and each raised by a catch, which could be thrown out, at the proper moment, by a wedge with which it came in contact as it rose with the opening valve. This wedge, or other equivalent device, was so adjusted that the valve should be detached and fall to its seat when the piston reached that point in its movement, after taking steam, at which expansion was to commence. From this point, no steam entering the cylinder, the piston was impelled by the expanding vapor. The valve was usually the double-poppet.". As described by Somerscales (1990:283) it was 'a quick-closing valve gear using poppet valves, and a trip gear to control the cut-off ... with gravity assisted closure ... Sickels used a water-filled dashpot to decelerate the valve smoothly as it approached the end of its travel.'.

The device was not applied to the slide valve, which later became so ubiquitous in steam engines, but to poppet valves (also known as 'puppet valves' and 'drop valves'). These were first used by Watt for his beam engines in the 1770s or 1780s. Watt had fitted two conical valves to the upper steam passage to the steam cylinder and two to the lower passage. This is well illustrated in the text by Lardner (1840). This arrangement of two such valves per steam passage was described as the 'double-beat', 'balanced' or 'equilibrium' poppet valve by various authors (see e.g. Clark 1891). A schematic of equilibrium poppet valves appears in Buchanan and Watkins (1976) reproduced with further discussion in connection with Sickels by Somerscales (1990). However to reiterate, it is not the double poppet valve that can be attributed to Sickels, but a particular manner of its operation.

In 1843 and 1845 he further improved his design. Sickel's new type of valve made high-pressure steam engines possible, and it was copied extensively and appeared soon also in the Corliss engine. Sickels sued Corliss and later others for patent infringement, but although he won these court cases, they ultimately just consumed his own modest fortune: by the time the Corliss case was decided, the patents had expired, and in at least one other case, the defendant company failed shortly before the judgment is Sickels's favor was entered.

In the late 1840s, he began working on a steam-powered steering device for ships, on which he obtained U.S. patent 9713 on May 10, 1853. While the device worked, he did not succeed to find a buyer. Sickels even went to England, where he also obtained patents on his steering device, but having failed to sell his invention there either, he returned in 1867 to the U.S. In 1891 he patented a cam-operated actuating mechanism for steam poppet valves (relating back to his 1842 patent), superseding the complex mechanism he patented in 1845 and had re-issued with further documentation in 1860.

Subsequently, Sickels worked as a civil engineer in the American west, building bridges and railroads. In 1891, he became the head of the National Water Works in Kansas City. On January 7 of the same year, he became a member of the American Society of Civil Engineers.

Sickels is one of the people shown on the famous painting Men of Progress. In 2007, he was inducted in the National Inventors Hall of Fame.
