= Donald F. Holmes =

American chemist and inventor (1910–1980)

Donald Fletcher Holmes
- Born: 29 September 1910; Woodbury, New Jersey
- Died: 13 October 1980 (aged 70)
- Education: Amherst College (1931); University of Illinois
- Known for: Co-inventor of the process to develop multipurpose material polyurethane
- Awards: National Inventors Hall of Fame Inductee (1991)
- Scientific career
- Fields: Chemistry
- Workplaces: DuPont

Donald Fletcher Holmes (September 29, 1910 – October 13, 1980) was an American chemist and inventor. Holmes, along with William Hanford, invented the process for making the multipurpose material polyurethane. He received the polyurethane patent in 1942. Mixing polyols and hydroxyl compounds with di-isocyanates is the basis today for the manufacture of all polyurethanes. Polyurethane can be used in, but is not limited to, life-saving artificial hearts, safety padding in modern automobiles, and in carpeting.

Holmes was born in Woodbury, New Jersey. In 1931, he earned a Bachelor of Science in Organic Chemistry from Amherst College in Massachusetts. He would later earn a master's and doctorate from the University of Illinois. Holmes was posthumously inducted into the National Inventors Hall of Fame in 1991.

== Key patent ==
- Hanford, U.S. Patent 2,284,896, “Process For Making Polymeric Products And For Modifying Polymeric Products”
