= Portable optical air sensor =

Optical air sensors center around the detection of some form of light created by a chemical process, in order to identify or measure amounts of individual molecules. Portable sensors are specifically sensors that are easy to transport and use in the field.

== Sol-gel ==
One of the primary methods of optical air sensing involves taking a sol-gel, which is made by taking a sol, a liquid with stable colloidal particles, and mixing it with a gel, which is a three dimensional continuous network encompassing a liquid. The sol-gel is then exposed to a certain indicator which becomes part of the sol-gel. Typically the production of a sol-gel follows a hydrolysis and then condensation pathway.

Hydrolysis involves adding a hydrogen atom onto the gel. Condensation is a method involving bonding two different gel molecules together to create a sol-gel as a whole. This method consists of dissolving some solid into a solvent and then maintaining a basic pH as the mixture is refluxed to condense and produce a gel.

One example of the sol-gel method in use today is the feeling of air acidity. The sol-gel is made with an organic dye, (2-[4-(dimethylamino)- phenylazo]benzoic acid). The dye has a pH color range of 6.7-8.7. This means that below a pH of 6.7 you see one color, in this case a red-pink, and at a pH higher than 8.7 you see a different color, in this case yellow, and you see a changing orange in between. The testing procedure is incredibly simple since all you have to do is expose the sol-gel to the air and monitor the color change.

Sol-gels can also be formed into monoliths, or columns, which are larger structures of sol-gel, unlike the typical thin layer. These monoliths are shown to be better for sensing molecules with smaller molar absorptivity, which are molecules that don’t absorb into something very well. An example of a molecule that would be measured here is a metal-ligand complex. These monoliths operate in a similar method to the thin layer sol-gels in that they trap some analyte and show a color change.

== Fluorescence ==
Another example of portable optical air sensors can involve fluorescence. One example of a fluorescence based sensor is an electronic nose, which can measure analytes in vapor or air. It operates so that an analyte is detected by different sensors in different ways to ensure what is being measured can be differentiated. As the vapor flows into the system it is hit with a high intensity light so that different organic dyes located in different small holes, or micropores, emit a certain wavelength and varied intensity of light based on what vapor compound they are in contact with. The light from the different sensors can then be compiled and used to determine what analytes were present. One large application of the fluorescent method is the detection of volatile organic compounds (VOC’s). Another type of fluorescent sensor focuses on metal complexes, rather than organic complexes. One example is the use of dirhodium tetracarboxylate structure to detect nitrogen monoxide, a common pollutant. This involves a nitrogen monoxide molecule coming in and bonding to the dirhodium tetracarboxylate to cause a shift in the intensity of the fluorescence of the molecule.

== Future ==
The future of the portable air sensors is to design them better able to detect small amounts of sulfur and ammonia and better able to quantify the amounts that are detected. Most portable sensors are now used in conjunction with some larger, more accurate system within a lab. The advent of microfabrication techniques, microelectro-mechanical systems, energy efficient sensor circuits, and advanced computer power has allowed portable sensors to thrive, but continued advancement of those components would further advance the benefits of using portable systems.
