= Louis W. Parker =

Louis W. Parker (born László Kolozsy 1 January 1906 — 21 June 1993) was a Hungarian-American inventor. During his career, Parker created over two hundred inventions including an audio-video synchronizer built for television and an oxygen level monitor for the Apollo program. For his contributions to the television receiver, Parker was inducted into the National Inventors Hall of Fame in 1988.

== Early life and education ==
On 1 January 1906, Parker was born in Budapest, Hungary. He moved with his family to the United States at seventeen and attended the City College of New York for his post-secondary education.

== Career ==
Parker began his electrical science career when he was ten years old. A few years later, he received his first patent for an automatic circuit breaker at the age of twelve. After moving to the United States, Parker worked as a capacitor builder before enlisting to the United States Army in World War II. Apart from the Army, Parker worked at multiple companies including International Telephone & Telegraph and Learjet. As an inventor, Parker created over 200 inventions including an audio-video synchronizer for television in 1947 and an air supply monitor for the Apollo program in the 1950s. After opening up a company in Stamford, Connecticut, Parker went to Fort Lauderdale, Florida to launch an electronics business in 1959. Outside of his inventions, Parker created the Parker Playhouse in 1966 and funded the creation of a self-named physical sciences learning center at Nova University in 1967.

== Awards and honors ==
In 1988, Parker was inducted into the National Inventors Hall of Fame for his contributions to the television receiver.

== Personal life ==
Parker was married and had three children.

== Death ==
On 21 June 1993, Parker died from a heart attack at Broward General Medical Center.
