= Joseph H. Burckhalter =

Joseph H. Burckhalter was a chemist who worked in the field of isothiocyanate compounds. In 1995 he was inducted into the National Inventors Hall of Fame alongside Robert Seiwald. Burckhalter is also a member of the Medicinal Chemistry Hall of Fame.

Burckhalter earned a B.S. in chemistry from the University of South Carolina in 1934 and an M.S. in organic chemistry from the University of Illinois, Urbana, in 1938. In 1942, he received his doctorate in medicinal chemistry at the University of Michigan, where he had been a graduate student of Frederick Blicke.
