= Mirowski =

Mirowski (feminine: Mirowska, plural: Mirowscy) is a Polish surname. Notable people with the surname include:

- Michel Mirowski (1924–1990), Polish-born American physician
- Philip Mirowski (born 1951), American historian and philosopher
