= Wearable cardioverter defibrillator =

External device for those at risk of cardiac arrest

A wearable cardioverter defibrillator (WCD) is a non-invasive, external device for patients at risk of cardiac arrest (SCA). It allows physicians time to assess their patient's arrhythmic risk and see if their ejection fraction improves before determining the next steps in patient care. It is a leased device. A summary of the device, its technology and indications was published in 2017 and reviewed by the EHRA Scientific Documents Committee.

== Description ==
A wearable cardioverter defibrillator (WCD) is an external device with a built-in defibrillator. The WCD is worn directly on the body by patients who are at transient risk for sudden cardiac death (SCD) for short-term risk mitigation and it does not require surgery for use. A WCD is also a temporary therapeutic option in case an implantable cardioverter defibrillator (ICD) cannot be implanted immediately. The WCD enables patients to continue their normal life without constantly worrying about their risk for SCD.

The WCD is a non-invasive medical device. It consists of a fabric garment, electrodes located in the fabric garment for sensing and delivering an electrical shock, and a battery-powered device that monitors the patient and connects to the electrodes and defibrillation pads. The WCD is worn under the clothing during the entire day. The WCD should only be removed when taking a shower or bath. The electrodes lie directly on the skin. The monitoring device constantly records heart rate and rhythm. If life-threatening cardiac arrhythmias, such as ventricular tachycardia (VT) or ventricular fibrillation (VF) are detected, the defibrillator delivers one or more treatment shock(s) in order to restore a normal heart rhythm. Since the time between a cardiac arrest and defibrillation is directly linked to survival, a treatment shock must be delivered within a few minutes after an event to be effective. With every passing minute without treatment, the chances of patient survival is reduced by 7-10%. From detecting a life-threatening cardiac arrhythmia to automatically delivering a treatment shock, the WCD usually needs less than a minute. The first treatment shock success rate for resuscitating patients from SCD is 98%. Intervention from bystanders or emergency personnel is not required for the WCD to work.

The use of the WCD is recommended for the prevention of SCD in the 2006 international joint guidelines from the American College of Cardiology, American Heart Association, and European Society of Cardiology (ACC/AHA/ESC), European Society of Cardiology (ESC) guidelines from 2015 and 2021, and American Heart Association, American College of Cardiology, Heart Rhythm Society (AHA/ACC/HRS) guidelines from 2017. The International Society for Heart and Lung Transplantation (ISHLT) recommends wearable external defibrillators as a bridge therapy for patients waiting for a heart transplant in their Guidelines for the Care of Cardiac Transplant Candidates. In the United Kingdom (UK) the WCD LifeVest® from ZOLL is available for temporary use on a monthly rental basis since 2017.

The WCD is a temporary therapeutic option for patients waiting for an ICD, patients with an ICD that had to be removed (e.g., due to infection), or patients who can't have an ICD but are at transient risk for SCD. The WCD allows physicians time to assess their patient's cardiac arrhythmic risk, make appropriate treatment plans and monitor cardiac output before or after an invasive cardiac procedure (such as bypass surgery, stent placement or heart transplant) or in patients at high risk for SCD after myocardial infarction (MI).

Usual wearing time of a WCD is about 3 months but depends on the patient's needs and the prescription of the treating physician.

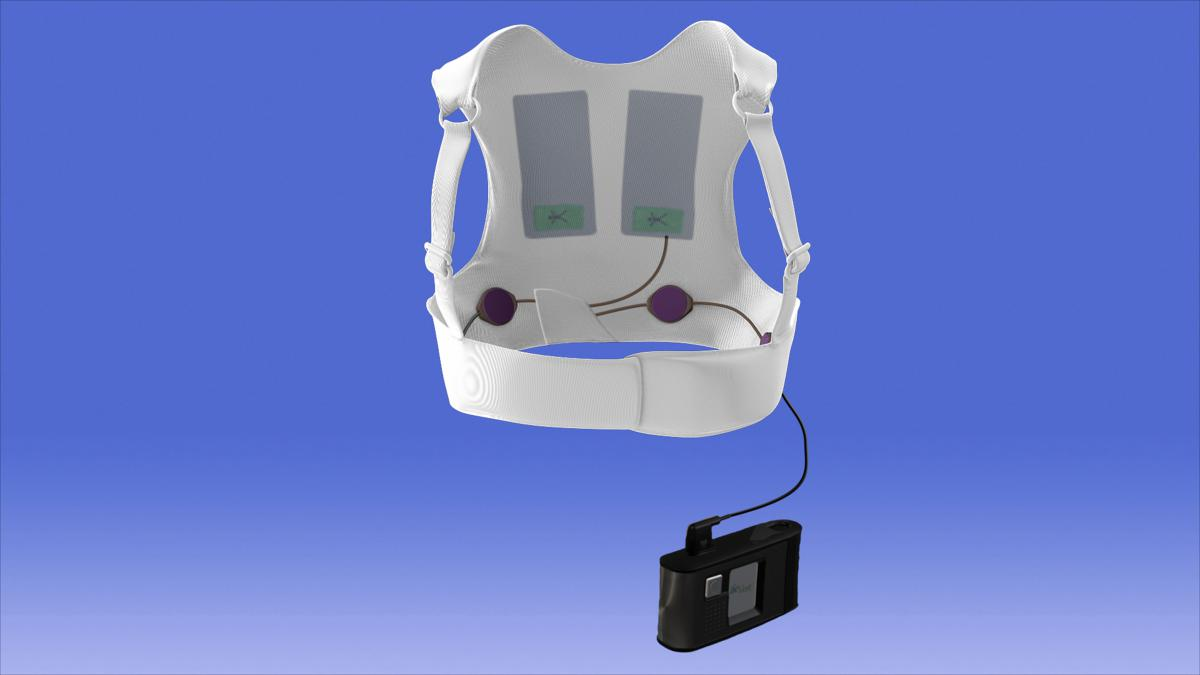
ZOLL LifeVest WCD showing vest and power supply

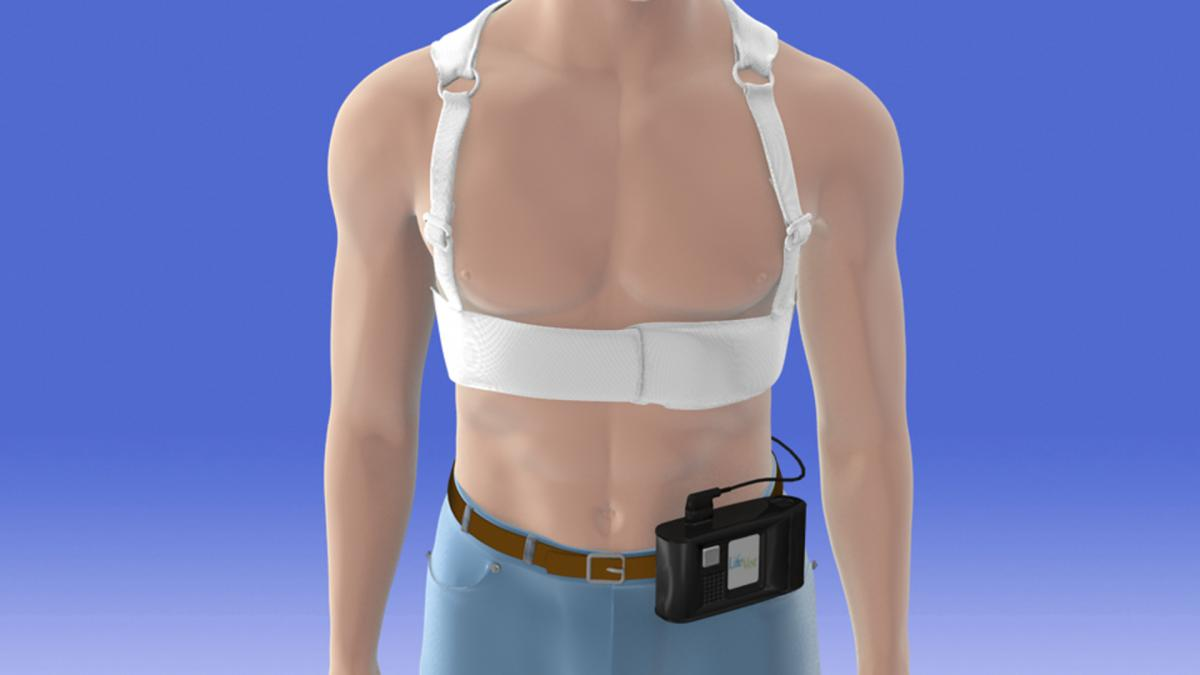
Zoll LifeVest WCD on person

== History ==
The use of cardiac defibrillation started in 1947—first in an open chest and ten years later through a closed chest with high energy levels. In 1972, cardiac defibrillation with intracardiac electrodes delivering much less energy of as low as 30 joules was established, following the development of portable units delivering high energy levels of up to 1000 volt. At Johns Hopkins University, doctors Mirowski, Mower and colleagues started developing implantable cardioverter defibrillators (ICD), and were able to implant an ICD in the first human by 1980. Over the years, the ICD was further improved and is now a standard outpatient procedure. There are limiting factors for direct prophylactic implantation of an ICD. For example, a diagnosed high risk for SCD may be temporary, which would oppose an implantation intended for lifetime use. Per current guidelines (e.g., the ESC guidelines from 2015 and 2021) a patient has to wait at least 40 to 90 days after the cardiac event (e.g., myocardial infarction or newly diagnosed heart failure with reduced left ventricular function) before the decision to implant an ICD should be made. An external, wearable cardioverter-defibrillator with defibrillation features similar to an ICD could be a solution to be used as "bridge" to protect these patients from SCD.

In 1986, M. Stephen Heilman and Larry Bowling founded LIFECOR and started the development of the first wearable cardioverter defibrillator (WCD). It was named LifeVest®. This WCD was extensively tested for three years in multi-centre and multinational clinical trials (WEARIT and BIROAD) in the United States and Europe. The results were used to improve the WCD and were also the basis for FDA approval in 2001 for use of the WCD for adult patients who are at high risk for SCD, who are not suitable candidates for an ICD or who refuse to have one. 14 years later (2015), FDA approval was received for the use of the WCD in children, who are at high risk for SCD and are not candidates for an ICD or do not receive one due to lack of parental consent. In 2000, prior to the FDA approvals, the WCD had already received the European CE-certification.

In 1986, M. Stephen Heilman and Larry Bowling founded Lifecor and along with a team of former Intec employees who developed the first implantable cardioverter defibrillator (ICD) began development of the WCD. The WCD was extensively tested for three years in 17 major medical centers across the United States and Europe. The clinical data collected from those trials allowed Lifecor to obtain FDA approval for use of the WCD in the United States.

In 2001, the FDA approved the LifeVest wearable cardioverter defibrillator (model 2000). The Lifecor business was acquired by ZOLL Medical Corporation in 2006 and Asahi Kasei in 2012. As of 2015, the LifeVest was available in the United States, Europe, Japan, Australia, Israel and Singapore.

The WCD LifeVest is marketed in the United Kingdom, United States, Europe, Japan, and several other countries worldwide. According to ZOLL, the LifeVest has been prescribed to more than 200,000 patients worldwide. In July 2021, the FDA approved a second WCD product for the market developed by Kestra Medical Technologies, Inc. This new device has an alternative fabric and garment style specifically for women.

== Insurance coverage in the United States ==
The WCD is covered by most health plans in the United States, including commercial, state, and federal plans as Durable Medical Equipment (DME) for those patients at high risk of cardiac arrest, including:

- Primary prevention [Ejection fraction (EF) ≤35% and Myocardial Infarction (MI), Non Ischemic Cardiomyopathy (NICM), or other Dilated Cardiomyopathy (DCM)] including:
  - After recent MI (Coverage during the 40-day ICD waiting period)
  - Before and immediately after CABG or PTCA (Coverage during the 90-day ICD waiting period)
  - Listed for cardiac transplant
  - Recently diagnosed NICM (Coverage during the three-to-nine month ICD waiting period)
  - New York Heart Association (NYHA) Class IV heart failure
  - Terminal disease with life expectancy of less than one year
- ICD indications when patient condition delays or prohibits ICD implantation
- ICD explantation

== Working mechanism of the WCD ==
The WCD uses dry, non-adhesive ECG electrodes to monitor the patient's heart rhythm. Three defibrillation electrodes are placed in the fabric garment, one on the chest (approximately at the level of the apex of the heart) and two on the back (between the shoulder blades). The ECG electrodes are placed inside the fabric garment on the chest providing two independent ECG leads. Prior to delivering a therapeutic shock, the dry defibrillator electrodes automatically deploy conductive gel to protect the skin from possible injury from the treatment. The WCD can deliver up to five consecutive shocks per sequence. Life-saving therapy typically occurs within a minute of the onset of an arrhythmia. The patient is warned when a treatment sequence has been started, e.g. by siren alarms and spoken information. Through interaction with the WCD, an unjustified shock delivery can be prevented by the patient as long as she/he is conscious. If the patient fails to respond, e.g., because the patient has lost consciousness due to an arrhythmia, gel is automatically ejected from under the defibrillation electrodes. If the arrhythmia resolves on its own, no treatment shock is delivered. Action from bystanders is not required, but they are warned by voice information not to touch the patient during defibrillation and to call emergency services.

The patient receives two rechargeable batteries for the WCD. One will be used to operate the monitoring device, the other is charged for daily replacement. Conspicuous ECG sequences or treatments are automatically transmitted to a secure server. The treating physician can view and analyze them via password-protected access. Before a WCD is handed to a patient, the WCD is fitted to the patient for accurate ECG signal detection and the patient receives detailed training to ensure correct handling of the WCD.

The efficacy and effectiveness of the WCD has been tested in clinical trials and several international post-marketing studies. If the WCD is worn correctly and ECG signal detection is optimal, the success rate of the first shock is approximately 98%. Hence, the WCD is as effective as an ICD in treating VT and VF. Long term follow-up studies showed that approximately 90% of all patients treated with the WCD are still alive one year after the heart failure incident. Since the WCD is a non-invasive garment, no injuries or scars remain after use and shock delivery. For effective protection, the WCD should be worn 24 hours a day and should only be removed for personal hygiene.

== Comparison of the WCD to Automated External Defibrillator (AED) and Implantable Cardioverter Defibrillator (ICD) ==
Automated external defibrillators (AED) are portable electronic devices designed to analyze the heart rhythm and inform the operator whether defibrillation is required. They are intended for people of the general population with an unknown risk for heart failure and are usually available in public places and first responder ambulances. AEDs are designed for use by laypersons and provide simple audio and visual instructions for the operator to follow. Electrode pads, placed by an operator on the chest of the patient, are for monitoring and defibrillation. In contrast to the ICD and WCD, an AED needs the immediate activity of a bystander in order to prevent the SCD.

WCDs are intended for patients with a known transient risk for SCD and meant for temporary use as described above.The WCD is the ideal therapeutic option to prevent SCD in patients until it is clear that a patient's heart issues are indeed permanent and long-term protection with an ICD must be applied.[36]

Implantable cardioverter-defibrillators (ICD) are electronic devices implanted in the chest with a lead to the right ventricle of the heart. They are intended for patients with permanent risk for SCD. An ICD is, like a WCD, designed to detect and terminate cardiac arrhythmias by emergency defibrillation. An extensive invasive surgery is necessary for implantation of the ICD, which is associated with a number of risks and morbidity. Therefore, the decision for an ICD should be carefully taken. The WCD is the ideal therapeutic option to prevent SCD in patients until it is clear that a patient's heart issues are indeed permanent and long-term protection with an ICD must be applied.

== Living with the WCD ==
The WCD allows patients at high risk for SCD who are discharged from the hospital to return to most of the normal daily activities without constantly worrying about their heart issues and possible fatal outcomes. A retrospective study investigating quality of life in patients who had been fitted with a WCD found that the majority did not feel any impairment in terms of mobility (68%), self-care (83%), daily routine (75%), pain (64%) and mental health (57%). Another prospective study evaluating depression and anxiety in patients eligible for WCD found a trend for better improvement of depression scores in patients who actually received the WCD.

Currently a study on the use of the WCD started in the UK.

In case of questions concerning which activities are possible, the manufacturer recommends consulting with the treating physician. The manufacturer also advises to avoid activities in loud and/or high vibration environments due to the possibility of missing an alert from WCD.

== Indications for receiving a WCD ==
The WCD is generally recommended as temporary therapy for all patients who are at risk of SCD and can be prescribed in the UK as a monthly rental device.

According to the international guidelines of ACC/AHA/ESC in 2006, the ESC in 2015 and 2021 as well as AHA/ACC/HRS in 2017 patients that may benefit from a WCD include:

Patients with reduced left ventricular pump systolic function (LVEF) of ≤ 35%

- In the first 40 days after a myocardial infarction (MI) without re-vascularization
- In the first 90 days after coronary re-vascularization with coronary artery bypass graft (CABG)
- In the first 90 days after percutaneous coronary intervention (PCI)

Newly diagnosed Ischemic Heart Failure with Reduced Ejection Fraction (HFrEF)

- For at least 90 days of optimal medical therapy

Patients with ventricular fibrillation (VF) or sustained ventricular tachycardia (VT)

- Spontaneous or inducible
- Occurring later than 48 hours after MI

Patients on the waiting list for a heart transplantation

Bridging the waiting time for patients

- With indicated or interrupted ICD therapy (e.g., ICD explanted due to infection or intolerance and pending potential re-implantation, delayed implantation for medical reasons including infection, recovery from surgery)
- With ongoing heart failure medication that needs adjustment
- With inflammation of the myocardium/myocarditis and waiting for resolution
- With familial or genetic risk for SCD if diagnostics have not yet been completed and/or an ICD has been ruled out

Newly diagnosed non-ischemic heart failure patient with reduced ejection fraction, including dilated cardiomyopathies (DCM) and New York Heart Association (NYHA) stage II-III heart failure patients

Patients in a risk phase of pregnancy cardiomyopathy (peripartum CM/PPCM)

The ISHLT has listed the WCD as a class I recommendation in its Guidelines for the Care of Cardiac Transplant Candidates since 2006. This means that patients waiting for a heart transplantation who are discharged from hospital should receive a wearable defibrillator to bridge the waiting time until receiving the transplant. The WCD is one of the procedures or treatments for which there is evidence and general agreement that it is beneficial, useful and effective in the given condition.

WCD has also been used in the specific circumstance where patients have an ICD but require temporary explantation for radiotherapy in the location of the ICD generator.

== Clinical trials on the efficacy of the WCD ==
After European CE-certification and FDA approval of WCD (LifeVest), a number of retrospective and prospective registries verified the efficacy and safety of the WCD. Data from more than 30,000 patients who have used the WCD are published for an expansive variety of indications. In the following only an excerpt is presented.

Meta-analyses

A meta-analysis of 11 comparable studies with approximately 20,000 non-overlapping patients in different indications was published by Nguyen et al. They found an overall mortality rate of 1.4%, a VT/VF rate of 2.6% and a VT/VF-related mortality rate of only 0.2% across all patients. 1.7% of the patients (9.1 patients/100 patient years) had received an appropriate treatment, which was successful in 96%. The inappropriate shock rate was <1.0%.

A systematic cross-indication review and meta-analysis of studies reporting treatment rates of WCD was conducted by Masri et al. in 2019. They analysed 28 studies and over 30,000 patients. Over a period of 3 months, 5 per 100 patients received appropriate WCD treatment shocks, and only 2 per 100 patients received inappropriate treatment shocks. Analyses of selection or publication bias (e.g., Egger-test) revealed, that there were no differences between independent and manufacturer-sponsored studies, and no differences between prospective and retrospective studies. According to the authors, the rate of patients, who were appropriately treated with the WCD over 3 months of follow-up, was substantial and much higher in observational studies compared to the RCT included in the analysis. The mortality rate was very low at 0.7 per 100 patients over 3 months.

Randomized controlled trial data

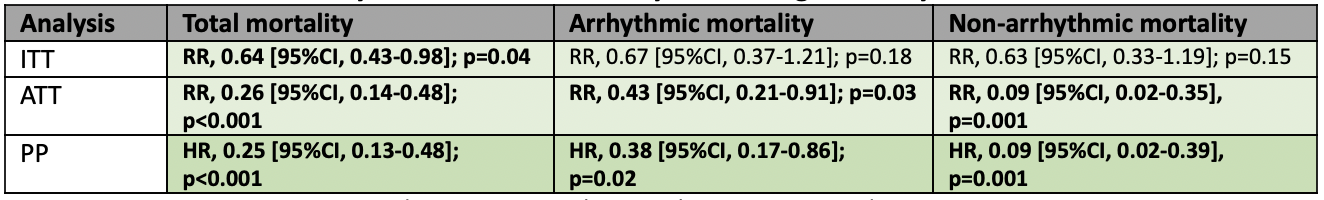
Overview of all analyses from the VEST study concerning mortality rates

The first and to this date only randomized controlled trial (RCT) on WCD use with post-MI patients is the VEST Trial, which was first published by Olgin et al. in 2018. In total 2,302 patients were included in the intention-to-treat (ITT) analysis. The primary outcome of the VEST-study, arrhythmic mortality, was 1.6% in the WCD group vs. 2.4% in the control group. The difference was not significant despite a 33% relative risk reduction (RRR). The secondary outcome of the VEST-study, all-cause mortality, was 3.1% in the WCD group and 4.9% in the control group. The difference was significant with a 36% reduction in mortality (RRR). Notably, in this study the average daily wearing time was only 14 to 18 hours/day, hence much lower than supposed according to observational studies. An additional as-treated analysis (ATT) provided as supplemented appendix to the original publication, revealed statistical significance in all mortality endpoints, thus positive results for the use of the WCD. In a per protocol analysis (PPA) published in 2020, the reduction in arrhythmic mortality was 62% and in all-cause mortality 75%, both significant results, which is comparable to the results shown in the ATT analysis.

These results indicated that the WCD is highly effective in reducing mortality rates in patients with a high risk for SCD. Essential factors in successful WCD therapy in everyday clinical practice are high wearing compliance and the use of the monitoring system provided by the manufacturer (ZPM Network).

Health technology assessments (HTA)

Aidelsburger and colleagues published the results of an HTA in 2020. The authors analysed data from 49 studies and concluded the WCD is a safe and effective intervention in cases of sudden cardiac arrest during the time needed for determination of long-term risk management strategies, that the WCD is reliable in detecting VT/VF events and shows a high rate of appropriate shocks which lead to a high rate of successful VT/VF terminations. Cortesi and colleagues published the results from another HTA in 2021. They focused on cost-efficacy comparing the WCD to "standard of care" in patients at risk for SCD after MI or ICD explantation. The authors found that the WCD is a cost-effective treatment option in patients after MI using the data from the VEST study. In patients after ICD explantation the WCD provided even a cost saving of €1,782 compared to 3 weeks hospitalization in a low intensity hospital (standard of care) using data from the Italian NHS. The authors concluded that for the Italian NHS the WCD use contributes to a more effective utilization of resources and to the improvement of patient care in clinical practice.

Currently an HTA is planned to be conducted in the UK.
