= Mir Imran =

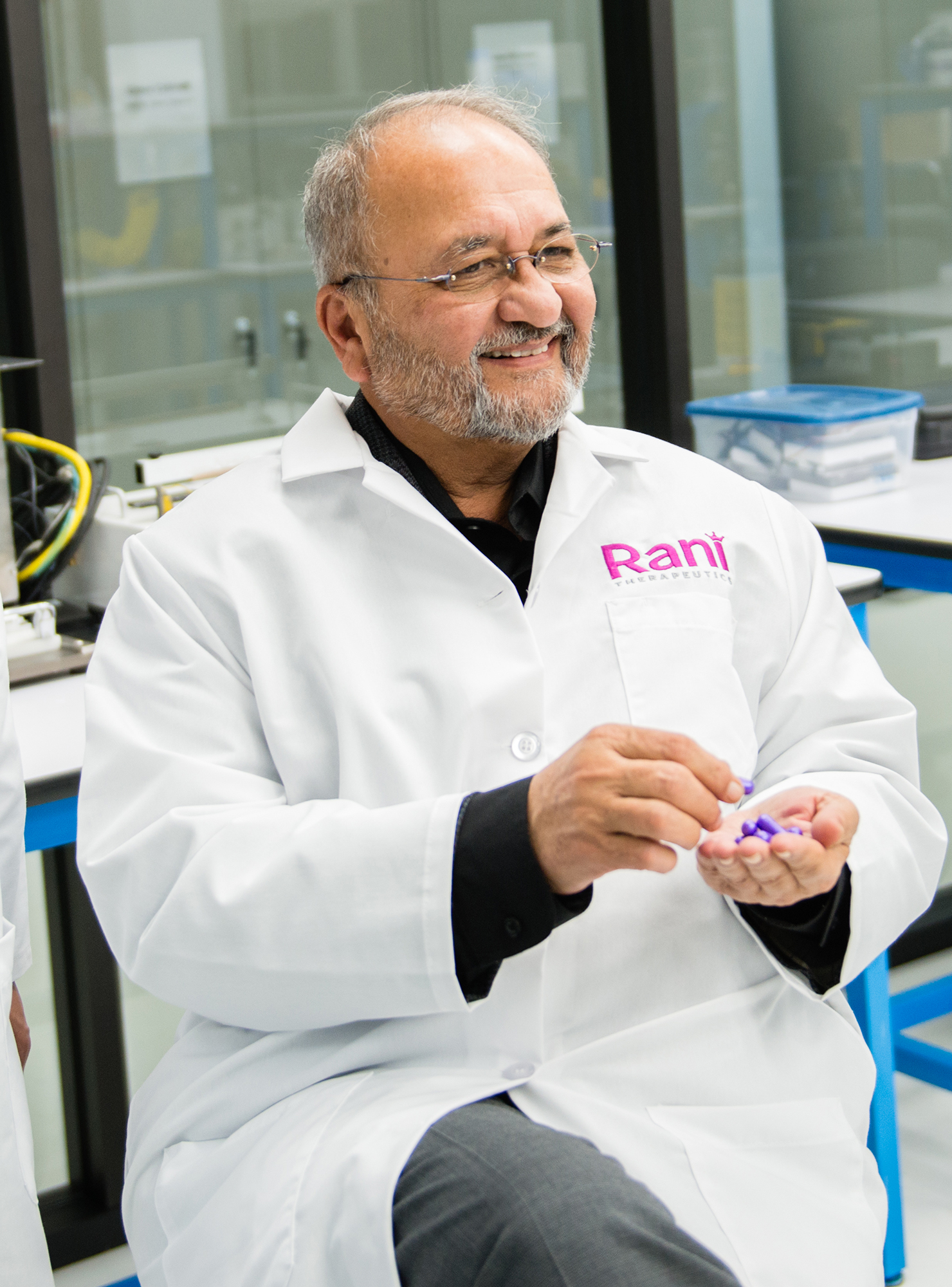
- Mir Imran
- Born: 14 May 1956 (age 69); Hyderabad, India
- Education: Rutgers University (BS, MS)
- Occupation(s): Founder and Managing Director, InCube Ventures (ICV)
- Website: Profile of Mir at InCube Ventures

Mir A. Imran (born 1956, Hyderabad, India), is an Indian medical inventor, entrepreneur and venture capitalist. Imran has formed over 20 medical device companies since the early 1980s and holds over 400 patents. He is known for his role in developing the world's first implantable cardiac defibrillator.

In 2017, Imran was elected a member of the National Academy of Engineering for his role in creating the first implantable cardiac defibrillator, and for developing multiple other technologies as inventor and entrepreneur.

== Early life and education ==
Born and raised in Hyderabad, India, the son of a doctor, Imran was a problem-solver from a young age. As a child, he enjoyed taking toys apart to see how they worked, and as a teenager learned how to repair and build AM radios.

After attending All Saints High School in Hyderabad, Imran moved to New Jersey in 1973 to attend Rutgers University. At Rutgers he received a BS in electrical engineering in 1976, followed by an MS in biomedical engineering. He then spent three years At Rutgers Medical School before deciding to leave and work on the first implantable cardioverter-defibrillator with Intec Systems.

Imran attributes his pursuit of innovation to being inspired by an experience he had as a college student: “I had a summer job working at The Matheney School for Cerebral Palsy Children. They needed engineers to develop communication devices for quadriplegic cerebral palsy children, so I built a machine for one severely afflicted girl. The unit translated her facial expressions using pre-recorded phrases, allowing her to communicate.”

== Innovation and entrepreneurship ==
Imran says that he is motivated by "understanding and trying to solve big problems in medicine." His interest is to develop medical devices that blur the distinction between organic and synthetic and advance patient treatment.

He joined Intec Systems in 1980 and developed IP key to the development of the automatic implantable defibrillator, a device that has saved hundreds of thousands of lives, and has become a standard of care in cardiology. Intec Systems was acquired by Eli Lily, spun out to form Guidant, and acquired by Boston Scientific in 2006 for $27.5 billion.

In 1992, Imran invented a cooled RF ablation catheter for the treatment of ventricular arrhythmias. This invention became the initial product of Cardiac Pathways, and is now widely used by cardiac electro-physiologists.

In 1995, he developed a low-pressure balloon and aspirator system for use in catheter-based interventions. Imran was the first to articulate the concept of embolic protection during high-risk interventions, and his device became the primary innovation for Percusurge, which was acquired by Medtronic in December 2000.

In 2017, Imran announced the development of the Rani pill, a novel approach to the oral delivery of large drug molecules which previously have only been deliverable via injections. Imran describes this development as “a mini swallowable auto-injector” that delivers the drug directly into the highly vascular intestine wall, allowing the drug to be absorbed quickly into the bloodstream.

Imran’s research interests are wide-ranging and include tissue engineering, gastroenterology, nephrology, neurology, orthopedics, congestive heart failure and artificial organs.

=== InCube Labs ===
Imran founded InCube Labs in 1995 after forming eight venture-backed medical device companies. Imran’s concept was that InCube would function as an applied research institute. Since the formation of InCube Labs, Imran has formed more than 20 life sciences companies. These include Rani Therapeutics, which was established in 2012 after beginning as a research project within InCube Labs.

== Venture capital ==
Imran is an active angel investor and a limited partner in several venture funds. He is the founder and Managing Director of InCube Ventures, a medical device venture fund.

=== InCube Ventures ===
InCube Ventures is an early stage life science venture capital fund. Imran co-founded InCube Ventures with Andrew Farquharson and Wayne Roe. The fund invests in both InCube Labs’ companies as well as external companies. The fund primarily invests in novel therapies that have the potential to dramatically improve patient care.

== Awards and recognition ==
Year	Title
2005	Rutgers University Distinguished Engineer Award
2009	Rutgers Hall of Distinguished Alumni
2010	Neurotech Reports’ Gold Electrode Award for Most Valuable Financial Professional
2015	Fellow of the National Academy of Inventors (US)
2017	Admitted to the National Academy of Engineering (US)
2018	Named as one of the San Francisco Business Time and Silicon Valley Business Journal’s Upstart 50
2018	MedTech Innovation Catalyst Award, for outstanding and life-saving innovations in the medical field
