= Naum Gurvich =

Naum Lazarevich Gurvich (Наум Лазаревич Гурвич) (April 15, 1905 – 1981) was a Soviet-Jewish cardiac physician, a pioneer in the development of defibrillators.

== Biography ==
Naum Gurvich was born in the village of Timkovichi near Minsk, Russian Empire. Early successful experiments of successful defibrillation by the discharge of a capacitor performed on animals were reported by N. L. Gurvich and G. S. Yunyev in 1939. In 1947 their works were reported in western medical journals. Serial production of Gurvich's pulse defibrillator started in 1952, model ИД-1-ВЭИ (the abbreviation stands for "импульсный дефибриллятор 1, Всесоюзный электротехнический институт", "pulse defibrillator 1, All-Union Electrotechnical Institute; the device was manufactured by the electromechanical plant of the Institute). It is described in detail in Gurvich's 1957 book, Heart Fibrillation and Defibrillation.

In 1958, US senator Hubert H. Humphrey visited Nikita Khrushchev and among other things he visited the Moscow Institute of Reanimatology led by Vladimir Negovsky(For many years, V.A. Negovsky had been supervising N.L. Gurvich at the Experimental Physiology and Resuscitation Laboratory, USSR Academy of Medical Sciences. V.A. Negovsky deserves a separate Wikipedia entry (see, for example, Peter Safar "Vladimir A. Negovsky the father of reanimatology, Resuscitation 49 (2001) 223-229, also the entry in russian - "Неговский, Владимир Александрович")., where, among others (The visit of senator Humphrey to the Laboratory is not described accurately. At that moment, the name of the Laboratory was the Experimental Physiology and Resuscitation Laboratory. In 1986, the name was changed to the Institute of General Reanimatology, USSR Academy of Medical Sciences (the term "reanimation" was introduced into clinical practice by V.A. Negovsky in 1961). The aim of the visit was a discussion with V.A. Negovsky, rather than with N.L. Gurvich. During the discussion, V.A. Negovsky was offered to move the Laboratory to the USA, which he rejected.), he met with Gurvich. Humphrey immediately recognized the importance of reanimation research and after that a number of American doctors visited Gurvich. At the same time, Humphrey worked on establishing of a federal program in the National Institute of Health in physiology and medicine, telling to the Congress: "Let’s compete with U.S.S.R. in research on reversibility of death".

In 1970 Gurvich was among the group awarded the USSR State Prize in science and technology "за предложение, разработку и внедрение в медицинскую практику ЭИТ аритмий сердца" (for the proposal, development and introduction into medical practice of electropulse therapy [ cardioversion ] of cardiac arrhythmias.)
