= Alois Langer =

American biomedical engineer (born 1945)

Alois A. Langer
- Born: February 24, 1945 (age 81); Pittsburgh, Pennsylvania
- Education: MIT, Carnegie Mellon
- Occupations: Inventor, Scientist, Entrepreneur
- Known for: Co-Inventor of the Implantable Cardioverter-Defibrillator (ICD)
- Awards: Induction into the Inventor’s Hall of Fame (2002)

Alois A. Langer (born February 24, 1945, in Pittsburgh, Pennsylvania) is an American biomedical engineer best known as one of the co-inventors of the Implantable Cardioverter Defibrillator (ICD).

Langer was inducted into the National Inventors Hall of Fame in 2002 for his contribution to developing the ICD. He studied electrical engineering at the Massachusetts Institute of Technology and completed his Ph.D. thesis at Carnegie Mellon University. In 1972, Langer became the chief biomedical engineer at MedRad Inc. and started work on the ICD project. In 1980, he oversaw the final testing and implantation of the device into a human patient. In 1990, Langer founded Cardiac Telecom Corporation and engaged in the development and marketing of telephonic cardiac monitoring systems. Langer currently lives in Forest Hills, Pennsylvania, and works part-time as a consultant.

== Early life and education ==
Alois A. Langer, son of Westinghouse researcher and inventor also named Alois Langer, was born and raised in Pittsburgh, Pennsylvania. His father encouraged him to do something with his life that would work for the benefit of the people. Langer went study electrical engineering at the Massachusetts Institute of Technology where he graduated in 1967. After graduating from MIT, he pursued a combined PhD in electrical engineering and biotechnology at Carnegie Mellon University. He completed his thesis on multidimensional electrocardiographic analysis.

== Development of the ICD ==
=== Medrad Inc ===
In 1972 Langer was hired by a company in Pittsburgh called Medrad Inc to work on the ICD project. The company president, Dr. Steve Heilman, had previously met with Baltimore cardiologist Dr. Michael Mirowski to discuss the possibility of developing the ICD. Mirowski had already patented the device and needed a company which would perfect it and manufacture it. Medrad took up the challenge of developing the ICD. Given Langer’s experience in electrocardiographic analysis and electrical engineering he was placed as the chief biomedical engineer of the ICD team. The fourth and last member of the initial team was Baltimore cardiopulmonary researcher Morton Mower.

=== Designing the ICD ===
As the engineering member of the ICD team, Langer was tasked with the design portion of development. He constructed both the miniature circuits on board as well as the mechanical packaging of the ICD. One of the time consuming tasks that Langer faced was the design of the electrode. This electrode needed to be reliable because it was the connection between the heart and the device that controlled all monitoring and defibrillation capabilities, however it also needed to be medically safe since it was being inserted into the body. Langer also had to design a battery that would power the device for several years without failing or causing any immune response in the body.

=== Testing The ICD ===
By 1976, Langer and the team had finished designing the device and started the rigorous and extensive testing process. For the next four years the ICT underwent animal models testing, design reviews, and other tests to verify that the device would indeed work. In 1980 the device was first implanted into a human subject at Johns Hopkins University. Langer was present in the operating room with the ICD device in hand; ready to be implanted into the first human. He was to test the device within the sterilized container just before it was to be implanted. Incidentally when he handed over the device to the nurse, it she lost control and dropped the device on the floor. Luckily Langer had brought duplicate for such incidents implanted this second copy successfully. Weeks later the team tested the device by inducing a potentially fatal arrhythmia. The defibrillator “took about 30-plus seconds or so” to restart the patient’s heart, says Heilman. Attending physicians were seconds away from giving up and jump-starting the heart with shock paddles when finally, says Heilman, “the device kicked in and did shock and did correct the rhythm.” By its completion, the ICD had 25+ patents.

== Cardiac Telemetry ==
During his work on the ICD, Langer met with several patients and their families and noticed that lot of families were very anxious. The families worried when a cardiac event might recur and felt they needed to watch over their loved ones continuously. From this observation, Langer got the idea for developing a patient worn device that would monitor the heart rhythm 24 hours a day and relay any trouble to medical staff. It wasn't until 1989 that Langer began to pursue the idea, and began searching for funding and investors. In 1990 Langer founded Cardiac Telecom Corporation in Greensburg, PA and started development on telephonic monitoring systems. Initially Langer and his team worked on developing the HEARTrac I Cardiac Monitoring System. The HEARTrac system was designed for patient in hospital rooms as cheaper alternative to expensive ICU Monitoring or cardiac step down units. The device was approved in early 1995 by the FDA and shipment began later that year.

=== Telemetry @ Home ===
Next, the device was adapted so that it could be used for patients at home. The product worked in a manner similar to home alarm systems. Cardiac data was acquired by the unit worn on the patient and continuously transmitted wirelessly to a Tele-Link unit located next to the telephone. The Tele-Link system is preprogrammed with various cardiac event criteria, and if it detects any such criteria on the patient, it immediately transmits the electrocardiogram (ECG) to a remote monitoring location. At the monitoring location the ECG is analyzed and action is taken within 15–20 seconds. The system even allowed for the patient’s physician to dial in and request recent cardiac recordings. Langer is credited as the inventor of this home cardiac monitoring service, referred to as Telemetry @ Home.

=== Super Bowl XXX Demonstration ===
In 1996, Langer flew to Tempe, Arizona for the Super Bowl XXX in order to demonstrate the HEARTrac system. Langer set up the device on Myron Cope, the famous sports broadcaster for the game, in order to see “just how excited Cope gets during the big games”. The ECG from Cope was transmitted live to a cardiologist in Pittsburgh, who monitored it and provided feedback. The demonstration was proclaimed as a technological victory for Langer and his company Cardiac Telecom.

== Later life ==
In 2002 Langer was inducted into the National Inventor’s Hall of Fame for his work on the ICD. On August 31, 2007, Langer’s Cardiac Telecom Corporation voluntarily filed for Chapter 11 Bankruptcy in order to reorganize the firm. Langer currently works as a Consultant and is involved in designing several non-medical alarm systems. Last known, he resides in Forest Hills, Pennsylvania.

== Selected Patents ==
- 5,966,692 “Method and system for monitoring the heart of a patient"
- 4,475,551 “Arrhythmia detection and defibrillation system and method”
- 4,407,288 “Implantable heart stimulator and stimulation method”
- 4,323,075 “Battery failure compensation for power supply used in implantable defib.”
- 4,291,707 “Implantable cardiac defibrillating electrode”
