= M. Stephen Heilman =

American physician

Marlin Stephen Heilman
- Born: December 25, 1933 (age 92); Tarentum, Pennsylvania
- Occupations: Inventor, Emergency Room Physician, Entrepreneur
- Notable work: Medical Technology

Marlin Stephen "Doc" Heilman (born December 25, 1933) is an American physician, entrepreneur and inventor. He is credited with inventions in the fields of contrast enhanced medical imaging, the first implantable cardioverter defibrillator or ICD, the first wearable defibrillator or LifeVest defibrillator, and heart assist devices. His first inventions, a flow controlled angiographic injector and pressure tolerant disposable angiographic syringes, advanced the fields of radiology and cardiology by improving the diagnostic image quality and eliminating the imaging risk of blood borne disease transmission from patient to patient. He founded Medrad Inc, now part of Bayer Healthcare, to manufacture and supply these imaging devices on a worldwide basis. In 2013, an estimated 65 million medical imaging procedures were performed using Medrad products.

Medrad and its subsidiary Intec Systems, in collaboration with Michel Mirowski and Morton Mower, developed the world's first implantable cardioverter defibrillator or ICD.

== Early life and education ==
Heilman was born on Christmas Day, 1933 in Tarentum, Pennsylvania.

He came from a family of doctors, including his brother, Daniel, his father, Glenn, his grandfather, Uriah Oury Heilman, his Uncle Marlin and Aunt Rena. Rena earned her degree from the Woman's Medical College of Pennsylvania and the rest from the University of Pennsylvania School of Medicine. Heilman graduated from medical school in 1959. All of them practiced medicine in and around Pittsburgh. The family also practiced Swedenborgian religion.

== Early career ==
Heilman worked as a Commander in the Air Force at the Tactical Air Command Hospital in the Netherlands from 1961 to 1963.

In 1964 he founded Medrad Inc., to commercialize an invention he made; it was a device to control the flow of contrast agent during angiography procedures.

He later founded a company called Lifecor to commercialize another invention, a wearable automated external defibrillator in the form of a vest. Lifecor was acquired by Zoll Medical Corporation in 2006, which in turn was acquired by Asahi Kasei in 2012. As of 2012 the company employed around 500 people near Pittsburgh.

== Defibrillators ==
Together with Mirowski and Mower through a company called Intec Systems, Heilman made the initial human automatic implantable defibrillator. In 2002, based on an ICD invention, Heilman, Langer, Mirowski and Mower were inducted into the United States Inventors Hall of Fame.
