= Sinai Hospital (Maryland) =

- LifeBridge Health
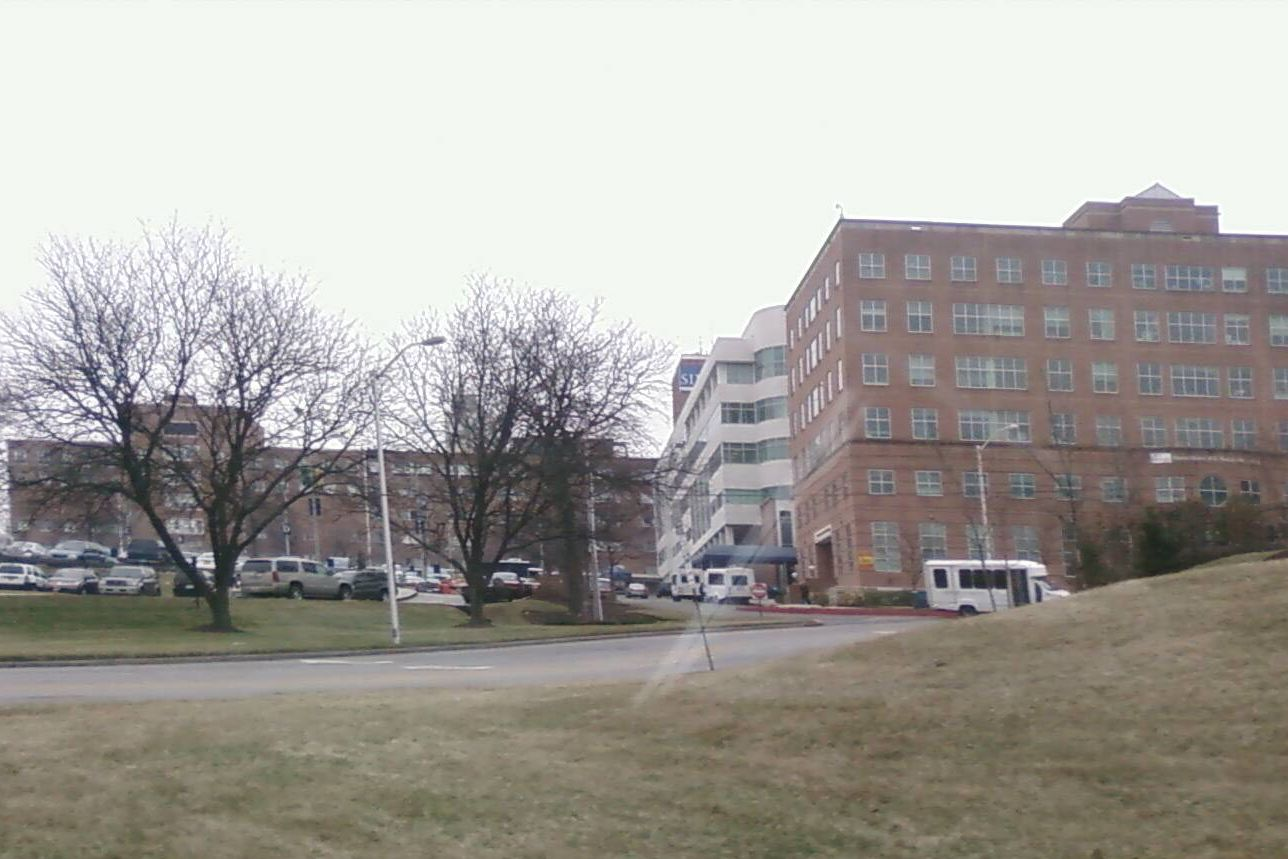

Geography
- Location: 2401 West Belvedere Avenue, Baltimore, Maryland, United States
- Coordinates: 39°21′10″N 76°39′44″W

Organization
- Care system: Private, non-profit
- Type: Teaching

Services
- Emergency department: Level II Trauma Center
- Beds: 483

Helipads
- Helipad: (FAA LID: 8MD3)

History
- Founded: 1866

Links
- Website: www.lifebridgehealth.org/sinai
- Lists: Hospitals in Maryland

Sinai Hospital is an American private hospital based in Baltimore, Maryland, that was founded in 1866 as the Hebrew Hospital and Asylum. It was originally located in East Baltimore, but is now located in Northwest Baltimore's Levindale / West Belvedere.

It is now a Jewish-sponsored teaching hospital that provides care for patients in the greater Baltimore City, Baltimore County and surrounding communities.

The implantable cardioverter-defibrillator (ICD) was invented at Sinai Hospital by a team composed of Dr. Michel Mirowski, Dr. Morton Mower, M. Stephen Heilman, and Alois Langer, all of whom are listed in the National Inventors Hall of Fame for their achievement.

Since 1998, Sinai Hospital has been a part of the LifeBridge Health system, which also runs Northwest Hospital in Randallstown, Carroll Hospital in Westminster, Levindale Hebrew Geriatric Center and Nursing Home (which is across the street from Sinai), Grace Medical Center in West Baltimore City, Rubin Institute for Advanced Orthopedics, several medical office buildings in the Baltimore area, and a health and fitness club called LifeBridge Health & Fitness, located in Pikesville, Maryland.

In 2016, the hospital turned 150 years old.

== Location ==
Sinai Hospital is located in Northwest Baltimore along Belvedere Avenue, near the intersection of Northern Parkway and Greenspring Avenue, and about a block away from Pimlico Race Course. The entrance to the emergency department known as ER-7 is accessible from Greenspring Avenue. The hospital itself is also surrounded by Cylburn and Lanier Avenues.

The hospital is very close to exit 10 off Interstate 83.

Several public bus lines operated by the Maryland Transit Administration serve the hospital, including Routes 1, 27, 44, and 91.

== Expansion ==
In 2012, Sinai Hospital added the 23,200-square-foot Herman & Walter Samuelson Children's Hospital space.

The 101-bed South Tower was added in 2016.

Sinai Hospital originally operated using a 99-year lease on land, and has been systematically buying land in and around its campus to expand. A $50 million expansion of its emergency room broke ground in 2022. A new 125,000-square-foot cancer center was announced in 2022, which received a $5 million gift from Mandy and Dennis Weinman in 2023.

== Specialties ==
The specialty areas at Sinai include:

- Alvin & Lois Lapidus Cancer Institute
- Bariatric Surgery Program at Sinai
- Sandra and Malcolm Berman Brain & Spine Institute
- Adult Hydrocephalus Center
- Spine Center at Sinai
- Stroke Center at Sinai
- CyberKnife® Center
- ER-7 Emergency Center
- Cardiovascular Institute
- Herman and Walter Samuelson Children's Hospital at Sinai
- Krieger Eye Institute
- Rehabilitation Center
- Rubin Institute for Advanced Orthopedics
- International Center for Limb Lengthening
- Center for Joint Preservation and Replacement
- Sinai Center for Thrombosis Research
- Sleep Center at Sinai

== Famous Patients and Patient Programs ==
Former Baltimore Orioles star pitcher Dave McNally was admitted to the hospital in late June 1975 with a case of chronic hiccups that had plagued him for nine days.

In the early 1990s, the hospital became a community focus for Soviet Jewish immigrants arriving in Baltimore.

Former Baltimore Orioles outfielder Paul Blair died at this hospital in late December 2013 after collapsing at a bowling alley in nearby Pikesville, Maryland.

The hospital celebrates an annual Baltimore Batman Day for pediatric cancer patients.

== Advanced Medical Training ==
Sinai Hospital operates a Level II Trauma Center, one of only three in Baltimore itself. As of January 2025, it is home to 7 ACGME-accredited residency programs for training medical residents, and hosts almost 500 medical students annually. As of 2025, more than 160 residents train at the hospital every year, up from about 140 a decade earlier.

Since May 2023, Sinai Hospital has functioned as a Regional Medical Campus for medical students from George Washington University, with students applying to conduct most third- and fourth-year rotations at the hospital. Beginning in the Fall of 2024, George Washington University's School of Medicine and Health Sciences has specifically matriculated 30 students in each entering class who will complete their third- and fourth-year rotations at Sinai Hospital. These students each receive a scholarship to underwrite part of their studies in Baltimore, thanks to a $10 million donation by Ellen Wasserman. Wasserman is a long-time major donor to the hospital, having given it more than $24 million over a 36-year period.
