= Multicenter Automatic Defibrillator Implantation Trial =

Multicenter Automatic Defibrillator Implantation Trial and MADIT II are implantable cardioverter defibrillator (or ICD) trials which investigate whether prophylactic ICD therapy in moderately high-risk coronary patients (in addition to conventional therapy) would significantly reduce death compared with patients treated with conventional therapy alone.

The MADIT II trial started in 1997 and ended in 2001 where the safety committee stopped the study because the benefits were already statistically significant.

The study included patients with a prior myocardial infarction and an ejection fraction less than or equal to 30%.

The results were a reduction in mortality of 31% compared to patients receiving conventional therapy alone.
