= Medrad Inc. =

American medical company

MEDRAD, Inc.
- Company type: Bayer Affiliate
- Founded: 1964
- Headquarters: Warrendale, Pennsylvania
- Key people: Sam Liang (President, CEO), Gary Bucciarelli (CAO)
- Number of employees: 1,700 (2008)
- Website: MEDRAD, Inc.

Medrad was an American company headquartered in Warrendale, Pennsylvania, until it was purchased by Bayer AG in 2006.

It was founded in 1964 by M. Stephen Heilman, a doctor who created the first flow-controlled, angiographic power injector in the kitchen of his home near Pittsburgh, Pennsylvania.

An emergency department physician by day, Heilman saw potential in angiography. Power injecting a contrast agent into the vessels, he reasoned, would enhance the image and make it possible to diagnose the heart disease and stroke patients who regularly came through the emergency department.

Heilman's invention was the first in a list of Medrad innovations. His company later introduced injector technology for computed tomography (CT) and magnetic resonance (MR) imaging.

Medrad has more than 1,700 employees, 1,200 of whom are in the Pittsburgh area. The company has branches around the world including the Netherlands, France, Germany, Italy, China, UK, Brazil, Japan, Norway, Belgium, Sweden, Denmark, Singapore, Egypt, Mexico, Cyprus and Australia.
