= Implantable cardioverter-defibrillator =

Medical device

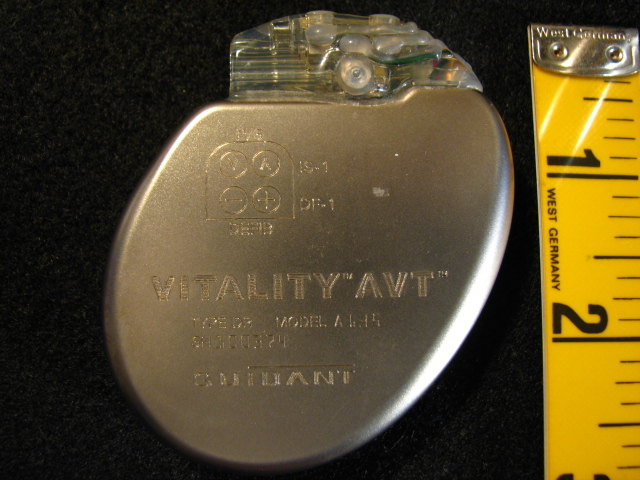
- A Guidant Corporation ICD device (length in inch)
- ICD-9: 37.94-37.97
- MeSH: D017147
- MedlinePlus: 007370
- eMedicine: 1971119

An implantable cardioverter-defibrillator (ICD) or automated implantable cardioverter defibrillator (AICD) is a device implantable inside the body, able to perform defibrillation, and depending on the type, cardioversion and pacing of the heart. The ICD is the first-line treatment and prophylactic therapy for patients at risk for sudden cardiac death due to ventricular fibrillation and ventricular tachycardia.

"AICD" was trademarked by the Boston Scientific corporation, so the more generic "ICD" is preferred terminology.

On average ICD batteries last from six to ten years. Advances in technology, such as batteries with more capacity or rechargeable batteries, may allow batteries to last for more than ten years. The leads (electrical cable wires connecting the device to the heart) have much longer average longevity, but can malfunction in various ways, specifically insulation failure or fracture of the conductor; thus, ICDs and leads generally require replacement every 5 to 10 years.

The process of implantation of an ICD system is similar to implantation of an artificial pacemaker. The first component or generator contains a computer chip or circuitry with RAM (memory), programmable software, a capacitor and a battery; this is implanted typically under the skin in the left upper chest. The second part of the system is an electrode wire or wires that, similar to pacemakers, are connected to the generator and passed through a vein to the right chambers of the heart. The lead usually lodges in the apex or septum of the right ventricle.

Just like pacemakers, ICDs can have a single wire or lead in the heart (in the right ventricle, single chamber ICD), two leads (in the right atrium and right ventricle, dual chamber ICD) or three leads (biventricular ICD, one in the right atrium, one in the right ventricle and one on the outer wall of the left ventricle). The difference between pacemakers and ICDs is that pacemakers are also available as temporary units and are generally designed to correct slow heart rates, i.e. bradycardia, while ICDs are often permanent safeguards against sudden life-threatening arrhythmias.

Recent developments include the subcutaneous ICD (S-ICD) which is placed entirely under the skin, leaving the vessels and heart untouched. Implantation with an S-ICD is regarded as a procedure with even less risks, and is currently suggested for patients with a previous history of infection or increased risk of infection. It is also recommended for very active patients, younger patients who will likely outlive their transvenous ICD (TV-ICD) leads and those with complicated anatomy/arterial access. S-ICDs are not able to be used in patients with ventricular tachycardia or bradycardia.

== Medical uses ==
Implantation of ICD is meant to prevent sudden cardiac death and is indicated under various conditions. Two broad but distinct categories are primary and secondary prevention. Primary prevention refers to patients who have not suffered a life-threatening arrhythmia episode. Secondary prevention has the strongest evidence for benefit and it refers to survivors of cardiac arrest secondary to ventricular fibrillation (VF) or hemodynamically unstable sustained ventricular tachycardia (VT) after reversible causes are excluded.

Similarly, ICD use in primary prevention is to prevent cardiac death in patients who are at risk for sustained ventricular tachycardia or ventricular fibrillation. This population accounts for the bulk of all ICD implants. There are a multitude of guideline indications for ICD use in primary preventions with varying degree of supporting evidence. Periodically, both the American College of Cardiology (ACC)/American Heart Association (AHA) and European Society of Cardiology provide an update to this guideline. Some of the Class I indications are as follows:

- With left ventricular Ejection Fraction (LVEF) ≤ 35% due to prior Myocardial Infarction (MI) who are at least 40 days post-MI and are in NYHA Functional Class II or III
- With Left Ventricular (LV) dysfunction due to prior MI who are at least 40 days post-MI, have an LVEF ≤ 30%, and are in NYHA Functional Class I
- With nonischemic Dilated cardiomyopathy (DCM) who have an LVEF ≤ 35% and who are in NYHA Functional Class II or III
- With nonsustained VT due to prior MI, LVEF < 40%, and inducible VF or sustained VT at electrophysiological study
- With structural heart disease and spontaneous sustained VT, whether hemodynamically stable or unstable
- With syncope of undetermined origin with clinically relevant, hemodynamically significant sustained VT or VF induced at electrophysiological study
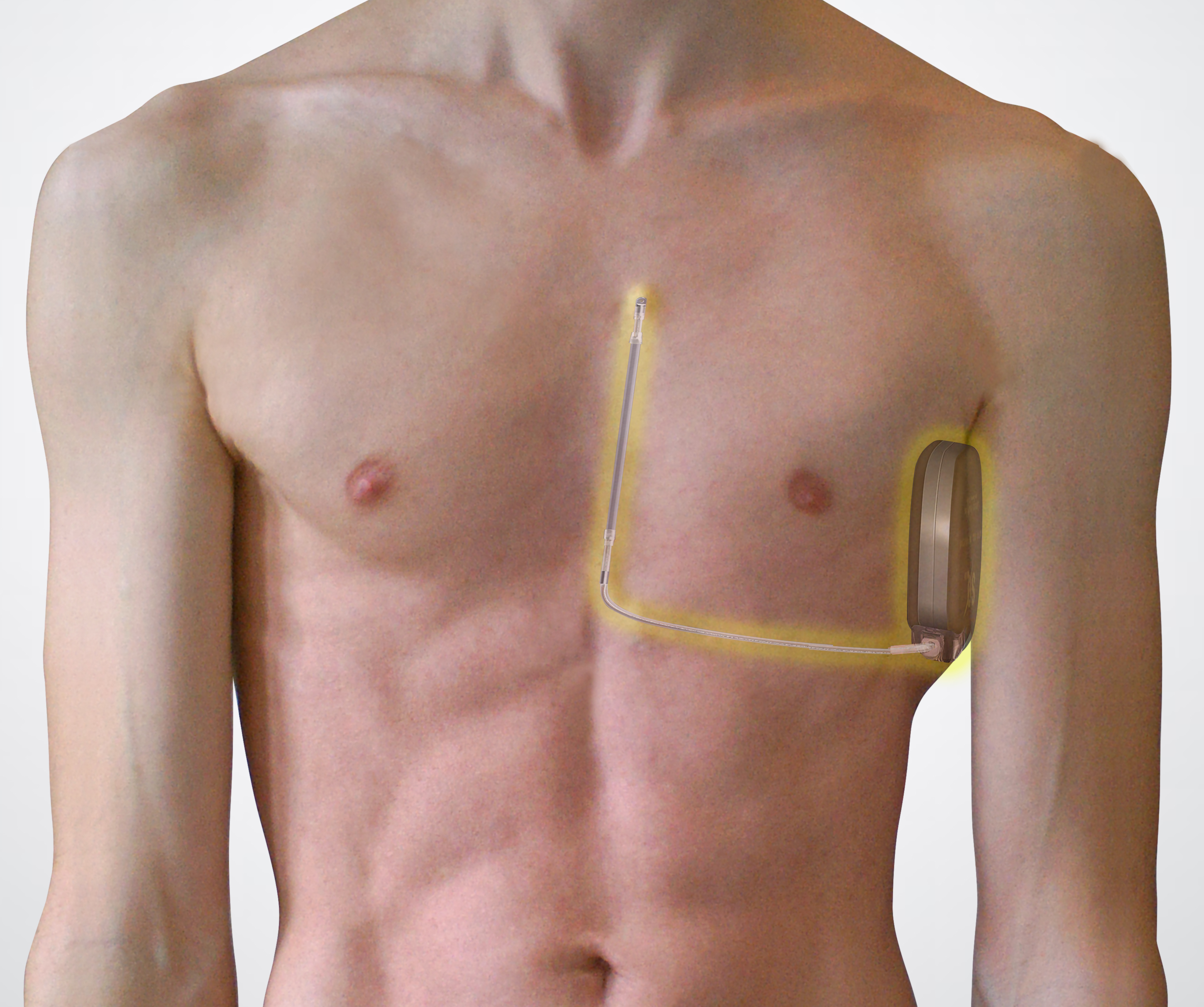
S-ICD lead and generator position

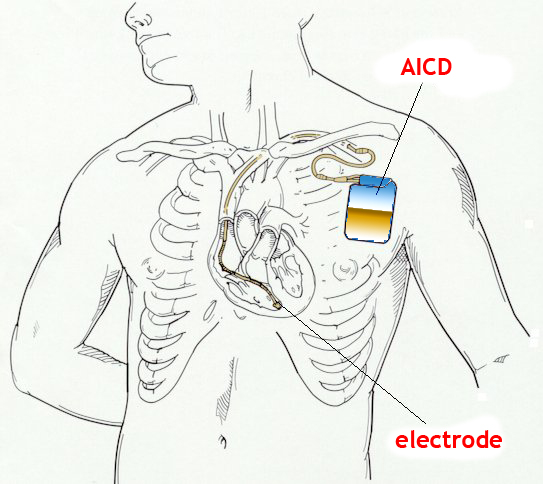
Sketch of an already-implanted cardioverter-defibrillator

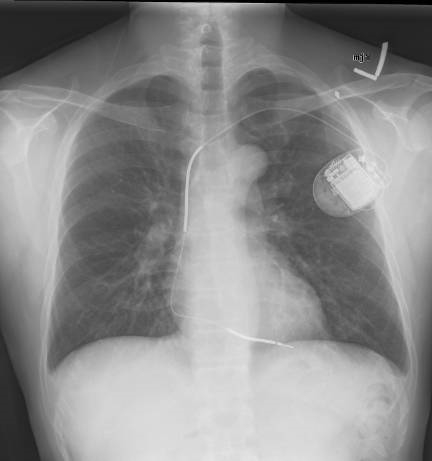
Chest X-ray of an single lead ICD, showing the ICD generator in the upper left chest and the ICD lead in the right ventricle of the heart. Note the 2 opaque coils along the ICD lead.

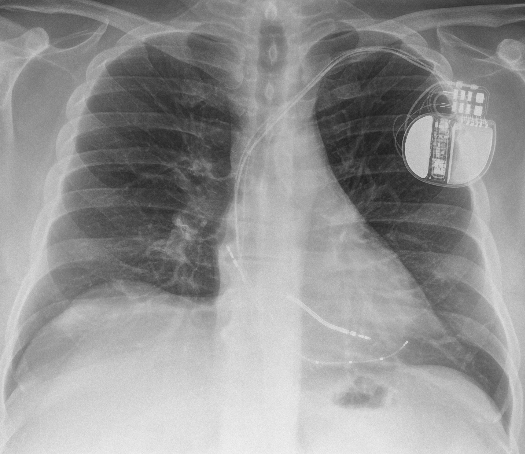
CXR of a two lead ICD

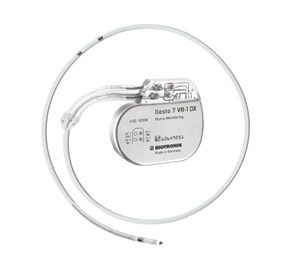
A single chamber ICD with its right ventricular lead connected into the header; note, starting from the end of the lead, the tip and adjacent first ring, used to sense the cardiac electrical activity and stimulate the right ventricle, the coil and the two rings for atrial sensing.

Drawing of an ICD

== Mechanism ==
Lead II electrocardiogram (known as "rhythm strip") showing torsades de pointes being shocked by an implantable cardioverter-defibrillator back to the person's baseline cardiac rhythm.

ICDs constantly monitor the rate and rhythm of the heart and can deliver therapies, by way of an electrical shock, when the heart rate exceeds a preset number. More modern devices have software designed to attempt a discrimination between ventricular fibrillation and ventricular tachycardia (VT), and may try to pace the heart faster than its intrinsic rate in the case of VT, to try to break the tachycardia before it progresses to ventricular fibrillation. This is known as overdrive pacing, or anti-tachycardia pacing (ATP). ATP is only effective if the underlying rhythm is ventricular tachycardia, and is never effective if the rhythm is ventricular fibrillation.

Many modern ICDs use a combination of various methods to determine if a fast rhythm is normal, supraventricular tachycardia, ventricular tachycardia, or ventricular fibrillation.

Rate discrimination evaluates the rate of the lower chambers of the heart (the ventricles) and compares it to the rate in the upper chambers of the heart (the atria). If the rate in the atria is faster than or equal to the rate in the ventricles, then the rhythm is most likely not ventricular in origin, and is usually more benign. If this is the case, the ICD does not provide any therapy, or withholds it for a programmable length of time.

Rhythm discrimination will see how regular a ventricular tachycardia is. Generally, ventricular tachycardia is regular. If the rhythm is irregular, it is usually due to conduction of an irregular rhythm that originates in the atria, such as atrial fibrillation. In the picture, an example of torsades de pointes can be seen; this represents a form of irregular ventricular tachycardia. In this case, the ICD will rely on rate, not regularity, to make the correct diagnosis.

Morphology discrimination checks the morphology of every ventricular beat and compares it to what the ICD knows is the morphology of normally conducted ventricular impulse for the patient. This normal ventricular impulse is often an average of a multiple of normal beats of the patient acquired in the recent past and known as a template.

The integration of these various parameters is very complex, and clinically, the occurrence of inappropriate therapy is still occasionally seen and a challenge for future software advancements.

== History ==
The development of the ICD was pioneered at Sinai Hospital in Baltimore by a team including Michel Mirowski, Morton Mower, Alois Langer, William Staewen, and Joseph "Jack" Lattuca. Mirowski teamed up with Mower and Staewen and together they began their research in 1969 but it was 11 years before they treated their first patient.

The work was begun against much skepticism even from leading experts in the field of arrhythmias and sudden death. There was doubt that their ideas would ever become a clinical reality. In 1972 Bernard Lown, the inventor of the external defibrillator, and Paul Axelrod stated in the journal Circulation – "The very rare patient who has frequent bouts of ventricular fibrillation is best treated in a coronary care unit and is better served by an effective anti-arrhythmic program or surgical correction of inadequate coronary blood flow or ventricular malfunction. In fact, the implanted defibrillator system represents an imperfect solution in search of a plausible and practical application."

The problems to be overcome were the design of a system which would allow detection of ventricular fibrillation or ventricular tachycardia. Despite the lack of financial backing and grants, they persisted and the first device was implanted in February 1980 at Johns Hopkins Hospital by Dr. Levi Watkins Jr.

The first devices required the chest to be cut open and a mesh electrode sewn onto the heart; the pulse generator was placed in the abdomen.

== Clinical trials ==
A number of clinical trials have demonstrated the superiority of the ICD over AAD (antiarrhythmic drugs) in the prevention of death from malignant arrhythmias. The SCD-HeFT trial (published in 2005) showed a significant all-cause mortality benefit for patients with ICD. Congestive heart failure patients that were implanted with an ICD had an all-cause death risk 23% lower than placebo and an absolute decrease in mortality of 7.2 percentage points after five years in the overall population.^{1} Reporting in 1999, the Antiarrhythmics Versus Implantable Defibrillators (AVID) trial consisted of 1,016 patients, and deaths in those treated with AAD were more frequent (n = 122) compared with deaths in the ICD groups (n = 80, p < 0.001). In 2002 the MADITII trial showed benefit of ICD treatment in patients after myocardial infarction with reduced left ventricular function (EF<30).

Initially ICDs were implanted via thoracotomy with defibrillator patches applied to the epicardium or pericardium. The device was attached via subcutaneous and transvenous leads to the device contained in a subcutaneous abdominal wall pocket. The device itself acts as an electrode. Most ICDs nowadays are implanted transvenously with the devices placed in the left pectoral region similar to pacemakers. Intravascular spring or coil electrodes are used to defibrillate. The devices have become smaller and less invasive as the technology advances. Current ICDs weigh only 70 grams and are about 12.9 mm thick.

A recent study by Birnie and colleagues at the University of Ottawa Heart Institute has demonstrated that ICDs are underused in both the United States and Canada. An accompanying editorial by Simpson of Queen's University explores some of the economic, geographic, social and political reasons for this.

== Living with an ICD ==
People who have an implanted cardioverter-defibrillator can live full lives, with generally either a sustained or improved quality of life. It may provide a strong degree of reassurance. As with a pacemaker, however, living with an ICD does impose some restrictions.

Almost all forms of physical activities can be performed with an ICD with moderation. All forms of sports that do not pose a risk of damaging the ICD or because of the underlying cardiomyopathy can be undertaken by the patient. Special care should be taken not to put excessive strain on the shoulder, arm and torso area where the ICD is implanted. Doing so may damage the ICD or the leads going from the ICD generator to the patient's heart. Particularly to be avoided are exercises that cause the clavicle to be pulled down towards the ribs, such as lifting weights with the arm, on the ICD site, while standing.

ICD patients in the United States are prohibited from professional or commercial driving per the Cardiovascular Advisory Panel Guidelines for the Medical Examination of Commercial Motor Vehicle Drivers. A driving abstinence for private drivers is recommended following ICD implantation, but the timeframe is variable depending on the country (between 3 and 6 months for secondary prevention and 1–4 weeks for primary prevention). Following an appropriate ICD-therapy, a driving ban is recommended for 3–6 months depending on the country. After inappropriate ICD-therapy delivered for non-ventricular arrhythmias or due to the device malfunction, driving restrictions usually apply until the cause of the inappropriate therapy has been eliminated.

Equipment using magnets or generating magnetic fields, or any similar environment, must be avoided by patients with an ICD. As with other metallic objects, an ICD is normally a contraindication to the use of magnetic resonance imaging (MRI). However, several ICD manufacturers have recently introduced MR-Conditional ICDs, which allow the use of MRI under specified safe operating conditions.

Implantable cardioverter defibrillators have demonstrated clear life-saving benefits, while concerns about patient acceptance and psychological adjustment to the ICD have been the focus of much research. Researchers, including those from the field of cardiac psychology, have concluded that the quality of life (QoL) of ICD patients is at least equal to, or better than, that of those taking anti-arrhythmic medications. The largest study of examined 2,521 patients with stable heart failure in the SCD-HeFT trial. Results indicated that there were no differences between ICD-treated and medication-treated groups at 30 months in patient-reported QoL. Psychological adjustment following ICD implantation has also been well studied. In rare cases, the ICD can become infected and is usually bacterial in origin but other organisms such as certain fungi have occasionally been implicated. This is more likely to occur in people with diabetes, heart failure, kidney failure, or a suppressed immune system.

Anxiety is a common psychological side effect, with approximately 13–38% of ICD patients reporting clinically significant anxiety. The primary etiological factors contributing to anxiety in ICD patients have not been determined, however. Depressive symptoms are also common, but the incidence of these problems has been shown to be similar to those observed in other cardiac patient groups, with approximately 24–41% of patients with ICDs experiencing depressive symptoms. Problems in psychosocial adjustment to ICDs, including the experience of anxiety, among spouses or other romantic partners are also prevalent. This phenomenon may be related, at least in part, to shared shock anxiety and avoidance of physical and sexual contact.

Patients are generally required to follow up with their electrophysiologist cardiologist at regular intervals, mostly 3 to 6 months. At this time, many device manufactures have some form of home monitoring to allow for device data to be sent in electronically to the physician. Recent advances include app integration for home interrogation and remote care has been correlated with some mortality benefit.

== See also ==
- Artificial cardiac pacemaker
- Brugada syndrome
- Cardiopulmonary resuscitation (CPR)
- Defibrillation
- Wearable cardioverter defibrillator
