= Michel Mirowski =

American cardiologist

Michel Mirowski (October 14, 1924 – March 26, 1990) was a physician who helped develop the implantable cardioverter-defibrillator (ICD).

Born in Warsaw, Poland, he practiced medicine in Israel before coming to Sinai Hospital in Baltimore, Maryland. While there he collaborated with Dr. Morton Mower and later Dr. Stephen Heilman's artificial pacemaker company to develop the first implantable cardioverter-defibrillator.

== Early life ==
Mirowski was born as Mordechai Frydman on October 14, 1924, in Warsaw. When Nazi Germany invaded Poland in the fall of 1939, his father renamed him as Mieczysław Mirowski to try to protect him from the anti-Semitism of the time. Later, his French wife, Anna, would call him Michel, by which he became known.

To escape the Nazis, Mirowski fled to Ukraine, and for the next five years survived under the most appalling conditions. By 1944 he was an officer in a Polish regiment and returned to Poland where, as the war ended, he registered as a medical student at the University of Gdańsk. "Warsaw had been completely destroyed, including its ghetto," he remembered. "None of my family was left. I couldn't even find our old home." Mirowski attended medical school there for a year, but gradually came to believe,

"I had to leave Poland. I had become a Zionist. After all that had happened and that I had seen, the Jews had to have a country of their own to survive. As far as Poland was concerned, it had become a cemetery for me. I told myself that I would never return."

=== Medical training ===
Mirowski emigrated to Palestine, but no medical schools were operating there in the early post-war years. He returned to Europe to seek training and entered the medical school at Lyon, France, in the fall of 1947. His French was poor, and his English almost non-existent. He listened to the lectures and demonstrations in French and studied medical texts in English as he taught himself both languages.

Graduating in 1954, Mirowski returned to Israel and to a position at the Tel Hashomer Hospital where he became first assistant to Dr. Harry Heller, the chief of medicine, an association which would eventually lead him to his great project. Having decided to practice cardiology, Mirowski studied at the Cardiological Institute in Mexico City and with Dr. Helen Taussig, the pioneering pediatric cardiologist at the Johns Hopkins Hospital in Baltimore.

=== Treating dangerous arrhythmias ===
For the next 5 years, Mirowski was the sole cardiologist at Asaf Harofeh Hospital, 15 miles from Tel Aviv. In 1966, Professor Heller started having episodes of ventricular tachycardia (a dangerous rapid heart rhythm) and died two weeks later while at dinner with his family.

Mirowski wondered what could have been done to prevent his mentor's death. He reasoned that it should be possible to implant a defibrillator in the body that would convert arrhythmias when they occurred. He consulted cardiologists who knew more about such devices. They told him that debrillators could not be miniaturized. In an era when defibrillators weighed 30 to 40 pounds, it seemed preposterous to propose reducing it to the size of a cigarette box.

Mirowski decided that only in the United States could he find the funds and technical support for the project that was becoming almost an obsession for him. Through an American colleague, Mirowski learned of a job at Sinai Hospital of Baltimore, an affiliate of the Johns Hopkins University School of Medicine, where he would be director of the coronary care unit but have half of his time to work on his defibrillator. So his family, which now consisted of Anna and their three daughters - each of whom would become a doctor - returned to the United States.

For the next 12 years, Mirowski and his colleagues developed their device and miniaturized it to be implanted in patients. On February 4, 1980, the first patient received a defibrillator, installed in an operating room at the Johns Hopkins Hospital. Since then, the device Mirowski invented, much improved and further miniaturized, has been installed in millions of patients.

== Later life ==
In the mid-1980s, Mirowski developed multiple myeloma, a cancer of the blood. When his medical condition became desperate, and fighting against the odds as usual, he insisted on receiving the most intensive chemotherapy. When the disease stopped responding, his oncologist raised the possibility of a bone marrow transplantation, then in experimental development for the treatment of myeloma. A near relative as donor would be needed. Mirowski's brother, Abraham, had been murdered in the Holocaust. Mirowski died on March 26, 1990, at the age of 65 years.

Though his work had been ridiculed for many years—someone described it as a "bomb inside the body"—and he was long unable to obtain grants to support the development of the defibrillator, the last five years of his life brought Mirowski both recognition and acclaim. Professional societies and leaders of academic medical institutions honored him. He received invitations to write more articles and give more lectures than he could accept. So he picked and chose, accommodating his friends and those who supported him in darker times. Often with his wife or children, he traveled where he wished since now he was welcome everywhere.

When he spoke overseas, Mirowski usually lectured in English, but he often discussed his papers during the question-and-answer period in the language of the country he was visiting. He spoke French, Hebrew, Polish, Russian, Spanish, and Yiddish fluently, but he never learned Italian and refused to learn German.

Mirowski was inducted into the National Inventors Hall of Fame for co-inventing with Morton Mower the automatic implantable cardioverter defibrillator (ICD) in the 1960s after his mentor died of a heart arrhythmia. The Patent number is 4,202,340
