= Shoe size =

Measurement scale for footwear

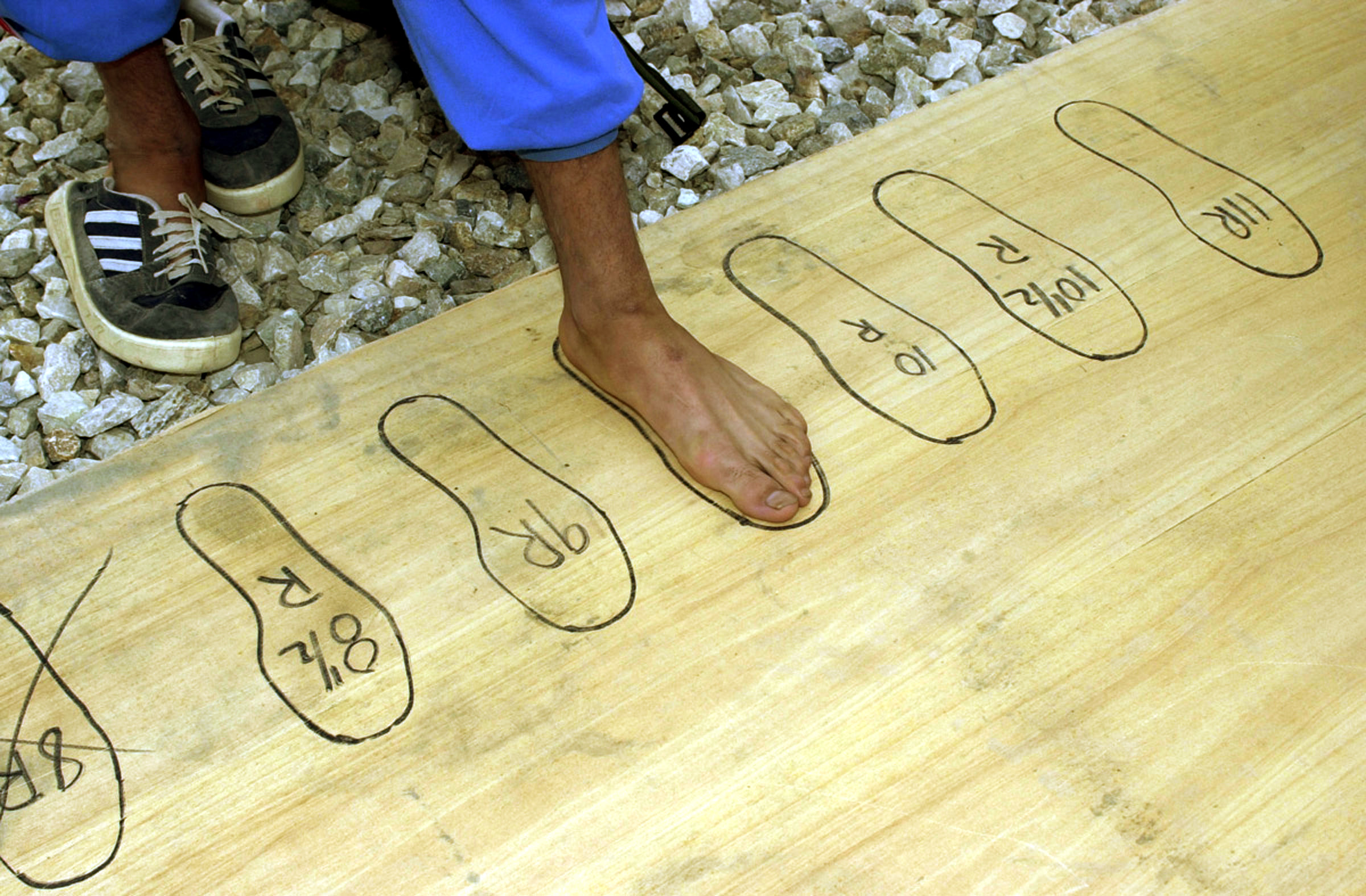
A soldier recruit measuring for shoe size during uniform issue at the Afghan National Army training site in Kabul, Afghanistan, 2002

A shoe size is a numerical indication of the fitting size of a shoe for a person. There are several different shoe-size systems used worldwide. While all use a number to indicate the length of the shoe, they differ in exactly what they measure, what unit of measurement they use, and where the size 0 (or 1) is positioned. Some systems also indicate the shoe width, sometimes also as a number, but in many cases by one or more letters. Some regions use different shoe-size systems for different types of shoes (e.g. men's, women's, children's, sport, and safety shoes).

In practice, shoes are often tried on for both size and fit before they are purchased.

== Deriving the shoe size ==
=== Foot versus shoe and last ===
The length of a person's foot is commonly defined as the distance between two parallel lines that are perpendicular to the foot and in contact with the most prominent toe and the most prominent part of the heel. Foot length is measured with the subject standing barefoot and the weight of the body equally distributed between both feet.

The sizes of the left and right feet are often slightly different. In this case, both feet are measured, and purchasers of mass-produced shoes are advised to purchase a shoe size based on the larger foot, as most retailers do not sell pairs of shoes in non-matching sizes.

Each size of shoe is considered suitable for a small interval of foot lengths, typically limited by half-point of the shoe size system.

A shoe-size system can refer to three characteristic lengths:

- The median length of feet for which a shoe is suitable. For customers, this measure has the advantage of being directly related to their body measures. It applies equally to any type, form, or material of shoe. However, this measure is less popular with manufacturers, because it requires them to test carefully for each new shoe model, for which range of foot sizes it is recommendable. It puts on the manufacturer the burden of ensuring that the shoe will fit a foot of a given length.
- The length of the inner cavity of the shoe. This measure has the advantage that it can be measured easily on the finished product. However, it will vary with manufacturing tolerances and only gives the customer very crude information about the range of foot sizes for which the shoe is suitable.
- The length of the "last", the foot-shaped template over which the shoe is manufactured. This measure is the easiest one for the manufacturer to use, because it identifies only the tool used to produce the shoe. It makes no promise about manufacturing tolerances or for what size of foot the shoe is actually suitable. It leaves all responsibility and risk of choosing the correct size with the customer. Further, the last can be measured in several different ways, resulting in different measurements.

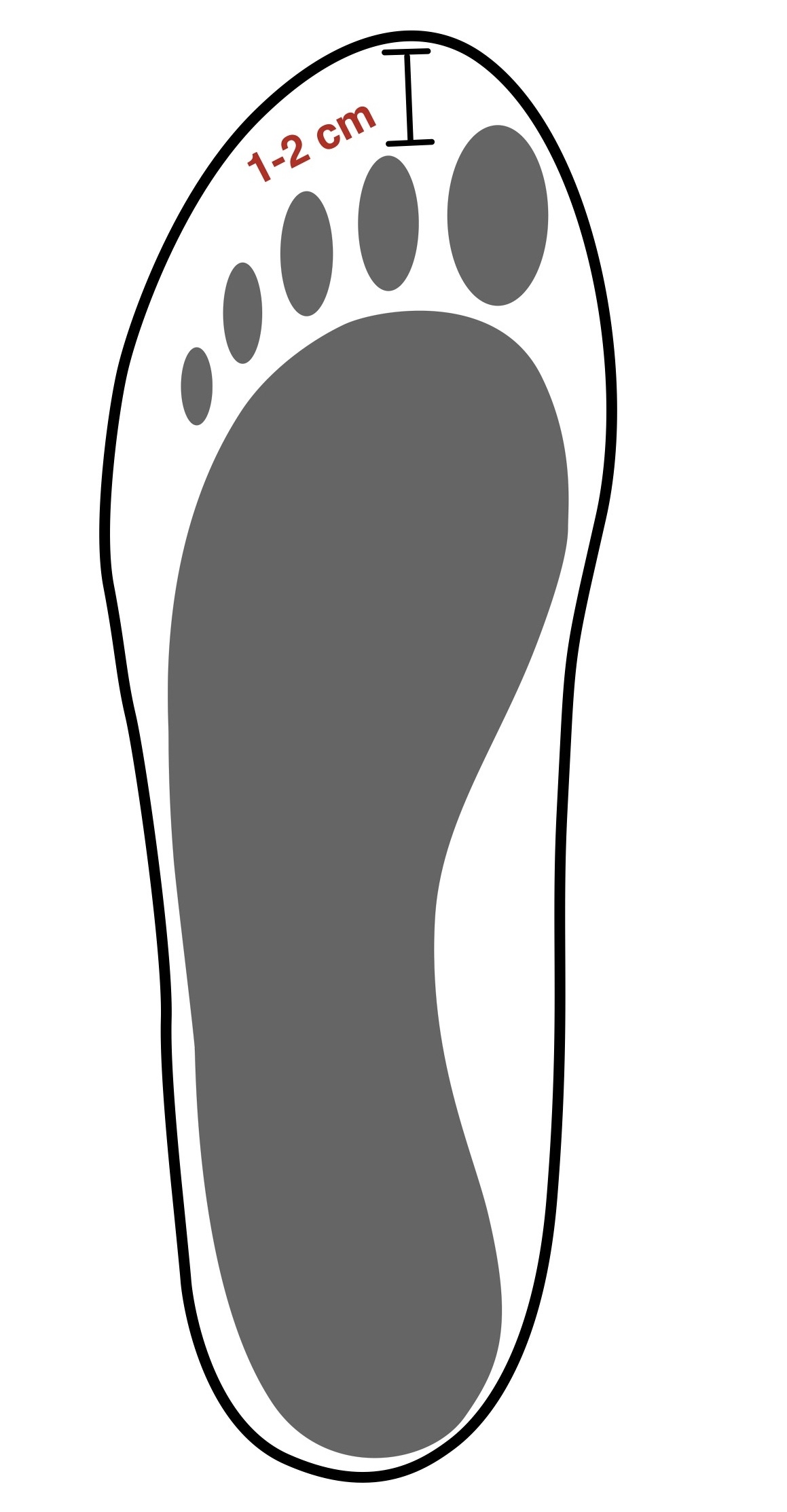
Cavity space in a shoe

All these measures differ substantially from one another for the same shoe. For example, the inner cavity of a shoe must typically be 15 mm longer than the foot, and the shoe last would be 2 size points larger than the foot, but this varies between different types of shoes and the shoe size system used. The typical range lies between 1/2 to 2/3 inch (13 to 17 mm) for the UK/US size system and 4/3 to 5/3 cm (13 to 17 mm) for the European size system, but may extend to 1/4 to 3/4 inch (6 to 19 mm) and 2/3 to 6/3 cm (7 to 20 mm).

=== Length ===
Sizing systems also differ in the units of measurement they use. This also results in different increments between shoe sizes, because usually only "full" or "half" sizes are made.

The following length units are commonly used today to define shoe-size systems:

- The Paris point equates to 2/3 centimetre (6.7 mm; 0.3 in). Whole sizes are incremented by 1 Paris point; this corresponds to 3.3 millimetres (0.13 in) between half sizes. This unit is commonly used in Continental Europe, and Russia and former USSR countries.
- The barleycorn is an old English unit that equates to 1/3 inch (8.5 mm). This is the basis for current UK and North American shoe sizes. In the US, the size number is approximately the barleycorn length minus a constant (22 for men and 21 for women). In the UK, that constant is 23 for both men and women.
- Metric measurements in millimetres (mm) or centimetres (cm), with intervals of 5 mm and 7.5 mm are used in the international Mondopoint system (USSR/Russia and East Asia).

Since the early 2000s, labels on sports shoes typically include sizes measured in all four systems: EU, UK, US, and Mondopoint.

=== Zero point ===
The sizing systems also place size 0 (or 1) at different locations:

- Size 0 as a foot's length of 0. The shoe size is directly proportional to the length of the foot in the chosen unit of measurement. Sizes of children's, men's, and women's shoes, as well as sizes of different types of shoes, can be compared directly. This is used with the Mondopoint system (USSR/Russia and East Asia).
- Size 0 as the length of the shoe's inner cavity of 0. The shoe size is then directly proportional to the inner length of the shoe. This is used with systems that also take the measurement from the shoe. While sizes of children's, men's and women's shoes can be compared directly, this is not necessarily true for different types of shoes that require a different amount of "wiggle room" in the toe box. This is used with the Continental European system.
- Size 0 (or 1) can just be simply a shoe of a given length. Typically, this will be the shortest length deemed practical; but this can be different for children's, teenagers', men's, and women's shoes - making it difficult to compare sizes. In America, the baseline for women's shoes is seven inches and for men's it is 7 1/3 in.; in the UK, the baseline for both is 7 2/3 in.

=== Width ===
Some systems also include the width of a foot (or the girth of a shoe last), but they do so in a variety of ways:

- Measured foot width in millimetres (mm) – this is done with the Mondopoint system.
- Measured width expressed as a letter (or combination of letters), which is taken from a table (indexed to length and width/girth) or just assigned on an ad-hoc basis. Examples are (each starting with the narrowest width):
  - AAA, AA, A, B, C, D, E, EE, EEE is the typical North American system and follows the Brannock device standards; on this system, B is narrow, C is regular, D is medium, E is wide, EE is extra wide and so on. The unlettered D size is the norm for men, and B for women.
  - 4A, 3A, 2A, A, B, C, D, E, 2E, 3E, 4E, 5E, 6E (variant North American).
  - C, D, E, F, G, H (common UK; "medium" is usually F but varies by manufacturer: Edward Green and Crockett & Jones, among others, use E instead, but one maker's E is not necessarily the same size as another's).
  - N (narrow), M (medium) or R (regular), W (wide), XW (extra wide).
  - For children's sizes in North America, typical letters used are M or B (medium), W or D (wide), EW or 2E (extra wide).

The width for which these sizes are suitable can vary significantly between manufacturers. The A–E width indicators used by most American, Canadian, and some British shoe manufacturers are typically based on the width of the foot, and common step sizes are 3/16 inch (4.8 mm).

Foot width conversion (approximate)
| N-M-R-W system | North American system | North American variant | UK system | German system |
|---|---|---|---|---|
| SS (super slim) | AAAA | 4A | | |
| S (slim) | AAA | 3A | | |
| N (narrow) | AA | 2A | B ("narrow") | E ("very slim") |
| N (narrow) | A | A | C | E |
| M (medium) | B | B | D ("standard") | F ("slim") |
| M (medium) | C | C | D | F |
| R (regular) | D | D | D | F |
| W (wide) | E | E | E ("wide") | G ("comfort") |
| XW/EW (extra wide) / WW (wide wide) | EE | 2E | EE | H ("strong") |
| UW (ultra wide) / WWW | EEE | 3E | EEE | J ("super wide") |
| UW (ultra wide) / WWW | EEEE | 4E | | K |
| XXW (extra extra wide) | EEEEE | 5E | | L |
| XXW (extra extra wide) | EEEEEE | 6E | | M |

=== Difficulties ===
There could be differences between various shoe size tables from shoemakers and shoe stores. They are usually due to the following factors:

- Different methods of measuring the shoes, different manufacturing processes, or different allowances even when the same system is used.
- An indication in centimetres or inches can mean the length of the foot or the length of the shoe's inner cavity.
- Differing amounts of wiggle room required for different sizes of shoes.
- For wide feet, a shoe several sizes larger (and actually too long) may be required and may also result in inconsistent size indications when different typical widths are attributed to specific shoe sizing systems.
- Some tables for children take future growth into account. The shoe size is then larger than what would correspond to the actual length of the foot.

Conversion tables available on the Web often contain obvious errors, not taking into account different zero points or wiggle room.

Although shoe size systems are not fully standardised, the ISO/TC 137 had released a technical specification ISO/TS 19407:2015 for converting shoe sizes across various local sizing systems. Even though the problem of converting shoe sizes accurately has yet to be fully resolved, this standard serves as "a good compromise solution" for shoe-buyers.

== Common sizing systems ==
=== United Kingdom ===
Shoe size in the United Kingdom, Ireland, India, Pakistan and South Africa is based on the length of the last used to make the shoes, measured in barleycorns (1/3 inch) starting from the smallest size deemed practical, which is called size zero. It is not formally standardised. The last is typically longer than the foot's heel-to-toe length by 1/2 to 2/3 in or 1 1/2 to 2 barleycorns, so to determine the shoe size based on actual foot length one must add 2 barleycorns.

A child's size zero corresponds to a last length of 4 inches (10.2 cm), and the sizes go up to size 13 1/2 (measuring 8 1/2 inches [21.6 cm]). Thus, the calculation for a child's foot size in the UK is:

child foot size = 3 × last length (in) − 12

equivalent to:

child shoe size ≈ 3 × foot length (in) − 10.

An adult size 1 is then the next half-size up (8 2/3 in [22.0 cm]) and each size up continues the progression in barleycorns. The calculation for an adult foot size in UK sizing is thus:

adult foot size = 3 × last length (in) − 25

equivalent to:

adult shoe size ≈ 3 × foot length (in) − 23.

Although this sizing standard is nominally for both men and women, some manufacturers use different numbering for women's UK sizing.

In Australia and New Zealand, the UK system is followed for men and children's footwear. Women's footwear follows the US sizings.

=== Mexico ===
In Mexico, shoes are sized either according to the foot length they are intended to fit, in cm, or alternatively to another variation of the barleycorn system, with sizes calculated approximately as:

adult shoe size = 3 × last length (in) − 25 1/2

equivalent to:

adult shoe size ≈ 3 × foot length (in) − 23 1/2.

=== United States ===
In the United States and Canada, the traditional system is similar to the British system but there are different zero points for children's, men's, and women's shoe sizes. The most common is the customary system where men's shoes are numbered higher by one than the UK equivalent, so that the same shoe would be marked 13 in the US and 12 in the UK.

==== Customary ====
The customary system is offset by 1/4 barleycorn or 1/12 in (2.12 mm) compared to the UK sizes. The men's range starts at size 1, with zero point corresponding to the children's size 13 which equals 24 3/4 barleycorns or 8 1/4 inches (20.96 cm).

However, most US manufacturers are using offsets greater than that standard; some offset by 1/2 barleycorn, others by 1 barleycorn. In current practice, US men's size 1 is expected to equal 25 barleycorns, or 8 1/3 in (21.17 cm), so the calculation for a male shoe size in the United States is:

male shoe size = 3 × last length (in) − 24

equivalent to:

male shoe size ≈ 3 × foot length (in) − 22.

In the "standard" or "FIA" (Footwear Industries of America) scale, women's sizes are men's sizes plus 1 (so a men's 10 1/2 is a women's 11 1/2):

female shoe size = 3 × last length (in) − 23

equivalent to:

female shoe size ≈ 3 × foot length (in) − 21.

There is also the "common" scale, where women's sizes are equal to men's sizes plus 1 1/2.

Children's shoes start from size zero, which is equivalent to 3 11/12 inches (11 3/4 barleycorns = 99.48 mm), and end at 13 1/2. Thus the formula for children's sizes in the US is

child shoe size = 3 × last length (in) − 11 3/4

equivalent to:

child shoe size ≈ 3 × foot length (in) − 9 3/4.

Alternatively, a Mondopoint-based scale from K4 to K13 and then 1 to 7 is also in use for children's shoes. K4 to K9 are toddler sizes, K10 to K13 are pre-school and 1 to 7 are grade school sizes.

==== Brannock Device ====
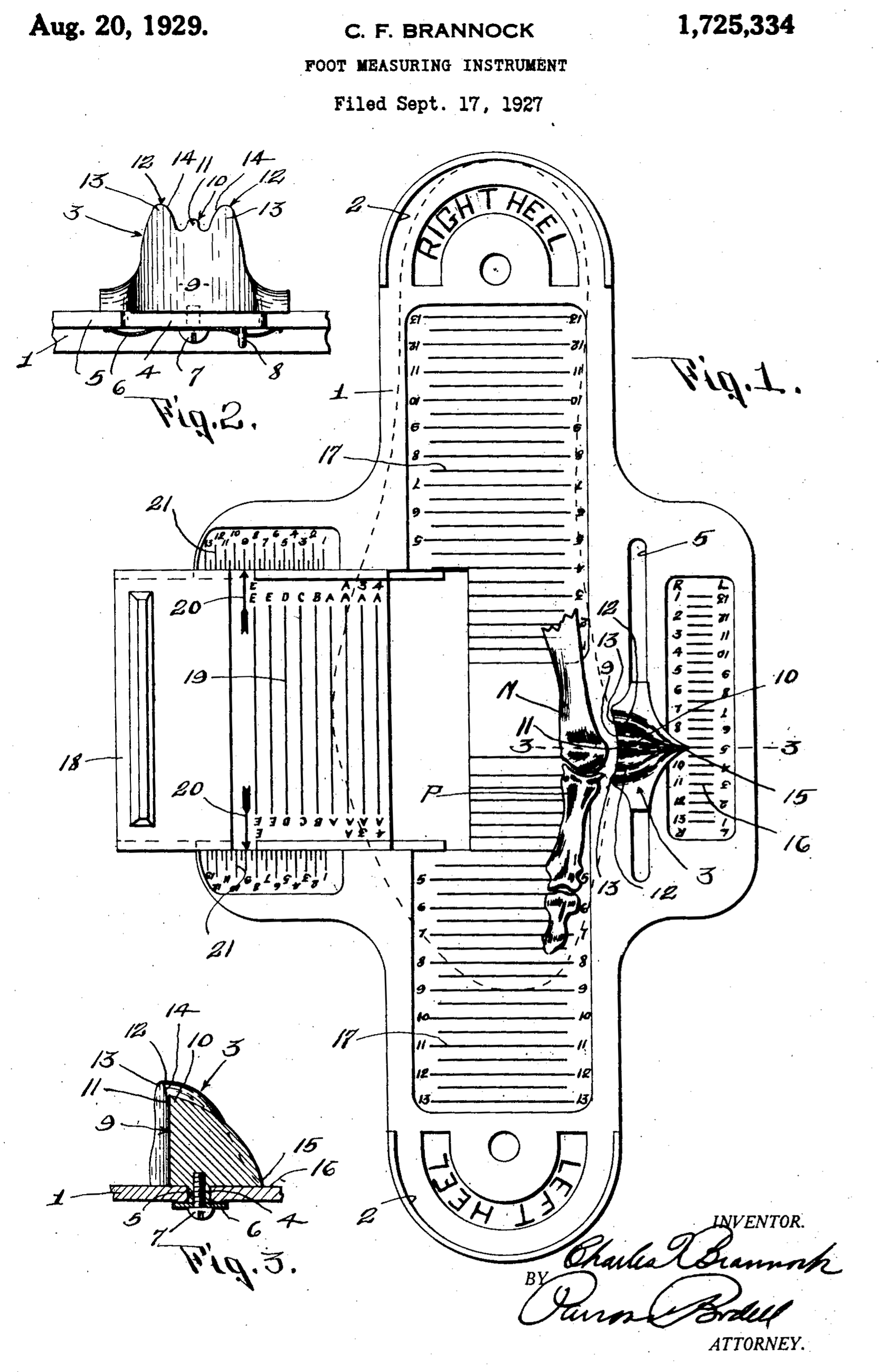
Drawing of a Brannock Device (from US Patent 1,725,334)

The Brannock Device is a measuring instrument invented by Charles F. Brannock in 1925 found in many shoe stores. The recent formula used by the Brannock device assumes a foot length of 2 barleycorns less than the length of the last; thus, men's size 1 is equivalent to a last's length of 8 1/3 in (210 mm) and foot's length of 7 2/3 in (190 mm), and children's size 1 is equivalent to 4 1/4 in (110 mm) last's length and 3 7/12 in (91 mm) foot's length.

The device also measures the length of the arch, or the distance between the heel and the ball (metatarsal head) of the foot. For this measurement, the device has a shorter scale at the instep of the foot with an indicator that slides into position. If this scale indicates a larger size, it is taken in place of the foot's length to ensure proper fitting.

For children's sizes, additional wiggle room is added to allow for growth.

The device also measures the width of the foot and assigns it designations of AAA, AA, A, B, C, D, E, EE, or EEE. The widths are 3/16 in (5 mm) apart and differ by shoe length.

Some shoe stores and medical professionals use optical 3D surface scanners to precisely measure the length and width of both feet and recommend the appropriate shoe model and size.

=== Continental Europe ===
In the Continental European system, the shoe size is the length of the last, expressed in Paris points or 2/3 cm (7 mm), for both sexes and for adults and children alike. The last is typically longer than the foot heel to toe length by 4/3 cm (13 mm) to 5/3 cm (17 mm), or 2 to 2 1/2 Paris points, so to determine the shoe size based on actual foot length one must add 2 Paris points.

Because a Paris point is 2/3 of a centimetre, a centimetre is 3/2 Paris points, and the formula is as follows:

shoe size (Paris points) = 3/2 × last length (cm)

equivalent to:

shoe size (Paris points) ≈ (3/2 × foot length (cm)) + 2

The Continental European system is used in Austria, Belgium, Denmark, France, Germany, Italy, Luxembourg, the Netherlands, Norway, Poland, Portugal, Spain, Sweden, Switzerland, and most other continental European countries. It is also used in Middle Eastern countries (such as Iran), Brazil—which uses the same method but subtracts 2 from the final result, in effect measuring foot size instead of last size—and, commonly, Hong Kong. The system is sometimes described as Stich size (from Pariser Stich, the German name for the Paris point), or Stichmaß size (from a German name of a micrometer for internal measurements).

=== Mondopoint ===
Measurement of foot length, width and perimeter (circumference) as defined in the Mondopoint standard

The Mondopoint shoe length system is widely used in the sports industry to size athletic shoes, ski boots, skates, and pointe ballet shoes; it was also adopted as the primary shoe sizing system in the Soviet Union, Russia, East Germany, China, Japan, Taiwan, and South Korea, and as an optional system in the United Kingdom, India, Mexico, and European countries. The Mondopoint system is also used by NATO and other military services.

The Mondopoint system was introduced in the 1970s by International Standard ISO 2816:1973 "Fundamental characteristics of a system of shoe sizing to be known as Mondopoint" and ISO 3355:1975 "Shoe sizes – System of length grading (for use in the Mondopoint system)". ISO 9407:2019, "Shoe sizes—Mondopoint system of sizing and marking", is the current version of the standard.

The Mondopoint system is based on average foot length and foot width for which the shoe is suitable, measured in millimetres. The length of the foot is measured as horizontal distance between the perpendiculars in contact with the end of the most prominent toe and the most prominent part of the heel. The width of the foot is measured as horizontal distance between vertical lines in contact with the first and fifth metatarsophalangeal joints. The perimeter of the foot is the length of the foot circumference, measured with a flexible tape at the same points as foot width. The origin of the grade is zero.

The labeling typically includes foot length, followed by an optional foot width: a shoe size of 280/110 indicates a foot length of 280 millimetres (11.0 in) and width of 110 millimetres (4.3 in). Other customary markings, such as EU, UK and US sizes, may also be used.

Because Mondopoint takes the foot width into account, it allows for better fitting than most other systems. A given shoe size shall fit every foot with indicated average measurements, and those differing by no more than a half-step of the corresponding interval grid. Standard foot lengths are defined with interval steps of 5 mm for casual footwear and steps of 7.5 mm for specialty (protective) footwear. The standard is maintained by ISO Technical Committee 137 "Footwear sizing designations and marking systems."

==== East Asia ====
In Japan, mainland China, Taiwan, and South Korea, the Mondopoint system is used as defined by national standard Japanese Industrial Standards (JIS) S 5037:1998 and its counterparts Guobiao (GB/T) 3293.1-1998, Chinese National Standard (CNS) 4800-S1093:2000 and Korean Standards Association (KS) M 6681:2007.

Foot length and girth (foot circumference) are taken into account. The foot length is indicated in centimetres; an increment of 5 mm is used.

The length is followed by designators for girth (A, B, C, D, E, EE, EEE, EEEE, F, G), which are specified in an indexed table as foot circumference in millimetres for each given foot length; foot width is also included as supplemental information. There are different tables for men's, women's, and children's (less than 12 years of age) shoes. Not all designators are used for all genders and in all countries. For example, the largest girth for women in Taiwan is EEEE, whereas in Japan, it is F.

The foot length and width can also be indicated in millimetres, separated by a slash or a hyphen.

==== Soviet Union (Russia, Commonwealth of Independent States) ====
Historically the Soviet Union used the European (Paris point) system, but the Mondopoint metric system was introduced in the 1980s by GOST 24382-80 "Sizes of Sport Shoes" (based on ISO 2816:1973) and GOST 11373-88 "Shoe Sizes" (based on ISO 3355:1975), and lately by GOST R 58149-2018 (based on ISO 9407:1991)

Standard metric foot sizes can be converted to the nearest Paris point (2/3 cm) sizes using approximate conversion tables; shoes are marked with both foot length in millimetres, as for pointe ballet shoe sizes, and last length in European Paris point sizes (although such converted Stichmaß sizes may come 1/2 to 1 size smaller than comparable European-made adult footwear, and up to 1 1/2 sizes smaller for children's footwear, according to ISO 19407 shoe size definitions). Foot lengths are aligned to 5 mm intervals (e.g. ... 170, 175, ... 245, 250,..) for sports and casual shoes, and 7.5 mm intervals (items highlighted in orange, e.g. 172.5, 247.5 are only included in this category) for protective/safety shoes. Optional foot width designations includes narrow, normal (medium or regular), and wide grades.

Infant sizes range from 16 (95 mm) to 22.5 (140 mm) and pre-school children from 23 (145 mm); schoolchildren sizes span 32 (202.5 mm) to 40 (255 mm) for girls and 32 to 44 (285 mm) for boys. Adult sizes span 33 (210 mm) to 44 for women and 38 (245 mm) to 48 (310 mm) for men.

Ranges:

- I: infants
- P: pre-school children
- G: girls
- B: boys
- W: women
- M: men

Infants and pre-school children
| Mondopoint/ foot length (mm) | Stichmaß (="gauge") size | Ranges included |
|---|---|---|
| 95 | 16 | I |
| 100 | 16.5 | I |
| 105 | 17 | I |
| 110 | 18 | I |
| 115 | 19 | I |
| 120 | 19.5 | I |
| 125 | 20 | I |
| 130 | 21 | I |
| 135 | 22 | I |
| 140 | 22.5 | I |
| 145 | 23 | P |
| 150 | 24 | P |
| 155 | 25 | P |
| 160 | 25.5 | P |
| 165 | 26 | P |
| 170 | 27 | P |
| 172.5 (Note: Protective/safety shoes) | 27.5 | P |
| 175 | 28 | P |
| 180 | 28.5 | P |
| 185 | 29 | P |
| 187.5 | 29.5 | P |
| 190 | 30 | P |
| 195 | 31 | P |
| 200 | 31.5 | P |

Older children and adults
| Mondopoint/ foot length (mm) | Stichmaß size | Ranges included |
|---|---|---|
| 202.5 | 32 | GB |
| 205 | 32 | GB |
| 210 | 33 | GBW |
| 215 | 34 | GBW |
| 217.5 | 34.5 | GBW |
| 220 | 34.5 | GBW |
| 225 | 35 | GBW |
| 230 | 36 | GBW |
| 232.5 | 36.5 | GBW |
| 235 | 37 | GBW |
| 240 | 37.5 | GBW |
| 245 | 38 | GBWM |
| 247.5 | 38.5 | GBWM |
| 250 | 39 | GBWM |
| 255 | 40 | GBWM |
| 260 | 40.5 | BWM |
| 262.5 | 41 | BWM |
| 265 | 41 | BWM |
| 270 | 42 | BWM |
| 275 | 43 | BWM |
| 277.5 | 43 | BWM |
| 280 | 43.5 | BWM |
| 285 | 44 | WM |
| 290 | 45 | M |
| 292.5 | 45.5 | M |
| 295 | 46 | M |
| 300 | 46.5 | M |
| 305 | 47 | M |
| 307.5 | 47.5 | M |
| 310 | 48 | M |

== ISO 19407 and shoe size conversion ==
ISO/TS 19407:2023 Footwear - Sizing - Conversion of sizing systems is a technical specification from the International Organization for Standardization. It contains basic description and conversion tables for major shoe sizing systems including Mondopoint with length steps of 5 mm and 7.5 mm, European Paris point system, and UK 1/3-inch system. The standard has also been adopted as Russian GOST R 57425-2017.

The standard is maintained by ISO/TC 137, which also developed ISO/TS 19408:2015 Footwear - Sizing - Vocabulary and terminology; in development are companion standards ISO/TS 19409 "Footwear - Sizing - Measurement of last dimensions" and ISO/TS 19410 "Footwear - Sizing - Inshoe measurement".

=== Shoe sizing ===
The adult shoe sizes are calculated from typical last length, which is converted from foot length in millimetres by adding an allowance of two shoe sizes:

$$\begin{align}
\text{EUR shoe size} &= \frac{L + 2\times{6.6\bar{6}} } {6.6\bar{6}} = \frac{3}{20}\times{L} + 2 \\[3pt]
\text{UK shoe size} &= \frac{L + 2\times{8.4\bar{6}} } {8.4\bar{6}}  - 25= \frac{3}{25.4}\times{L} - 23
\end{align}$$

where L is foot length in millimetres.

Direct conversion between adult UK, Continental European and Mondopoint shoe size systems is derived as follows:

$$\begin{align}
L &= \frac{20}{3} \times\left(\text{EUR shoe size} - 2 \right) =  \frac{25.4}{3} \times\left(\text{UK shoe size} + 23 \right) \\[3pt]
\text{EUR shoe size} &= {1.27 \times\left(\text{UK shoe size} + 23\right)} + 2 \\[3pt]
\text{UK shoe size} &= { \frac{\text{EUR shoe size} - 2}{1.27} } - 23
\end{align}$$

Using these formulas, the standard derives shoe size tables for adults and children, based on actual foot length measurement (insole) in millimetres. Typical last length ranges are also included (13 to 25 mm over foot length for adults, 8% greater than foot length plus 6 mm for children).

Exact foot lengths may contain repeating decimals because the formulas include division by 3; in practice, approximate interval steps of 6.67 mm and 8.47 mm are used, and sizes are rounded to either the nearest half size or closest matching Mondopoint size.

==== Size equivalence table, adult ====

Note: US Women FIA scales are used. For the "common" women scale add another 0.5.

Adults' shoe sizes (210 mm+)
| Foot length | | | Mondopoint | EUR | UK | US Men | US Women |
| (mm) | (cm) | (inch) | 5.0/7.5 mm | 6.66̅ mm | 8.46̅ mm = 1/3 inch | | |
|---|---|---|---|---|---|---|---|
| 210.0 | | | 210 | 33.5 | | | |
| 211.6̅ | | 8 1/3 | | | 2 | 3 | 4 |
| 213.3̅ | 21 1/3 | | | 34 | | | |
| 215.0 | | | 215 | | | | |
| 215.9 | | 8 1/2 | | | 2.5 | 3.5 | 4.5 |
| 216.6̅ | 21 2/3 | | | 34.5 | | | |
| 217.5 | | | 217.5 | | | | |
| 220.0 | 22 | | 220 | 35 | | | |
| 220.13̅ | | 8 2/3 | | | 3 | 4 | 5 |
| 223.3̅ | 22 1/3 | | | 35.5 | | | |
| 224.36̅ | | 8 5/6 | | | 3.5 | 4.5 | 5.5 |
| 225.0 | | | 225 | | | | |
| 226.6̅ | 22 2/3 | | | 36 | | | |
| 228.6 | | 9 | | | 4 | 5 | 6 |
| 230.0 | 23 | | 230 | 36.5 | | | |
| 232.5 | | | 232.5 | | | | |
| 232.83̅ | | 9 1/6 | | | 4.5 | 5.5 | 6.5 |
| 233.3̅ | 23 1/3 | | | 37 | | | |
| 235.0 | | | 235 | | | | |
| 236.6̅ | 23 2/3 | | | 37.5 | | | |
| 237.06̅ | | 9 1/3 | | | 5 | 6 | 7 |
| 240.0 | 24 | | 240 | 38 | | | |
| 241.3 | | 9 1/2 | | | 5.5 | 6.5 | 7.5 |
| 243.3̅ | 24 1/3 | | | 38.5 | | | |
| 245.0 | | | 245 | | | | |
| 245.53̅ | | 9 2/3 | | | 6 | 7 | 8 |
| 246.6̅ | 24 2/3 | | | 39 | | | |
| 247.5 | | | 247.5 | | | | |
| 249.76̅ | | 9 5/6 | | | 6.5 | 7.5 | 8.5 |
| 250.0 | 25 | | 250 | 39.5 | | | |
| 253.3̅ | 25 1/3 | | | 40 | | | |
| 254.0 | | 10 | | | 7 | 8 | 9 |
| 255.0 | | | 255 | | | | |
| 256.6̅ | 25 2/3 | | | 40.5 | | | |
| 258.23̅ | | 10 1/6 | | | 7.5 | 8.5 | |
| 260.0 | 26 | | 260 | 41 | | | |
| 262.46̅ | | 10 1/3 | | | 8 | 9 | 10 |
| 262.5 | | | 262.5 | | | | |
| 263.3̅ | 26 1/3 | | | 41.5 | | | |
| 265.0 | | | 265 | | | | |
| 266.6̅ | 26 2/3 | | | 42 | | | |
| 266.7 | | 10.5 | | | 8.5 | 9.5 | |
| 270.0 | 27 | | 270 | 42.5 | | | |
| 270.93̅ | | 10 2/3 | | | 9 | 10 | 11 |
| 273.3̅ | 27 1/3 | | | 43 | | | |
| 275.0 | | | 275 | | | | |
| 275.16̅ | | 10 5/6 | | | 9.5 | 10.5 | |
| 276.6̅ | 27 2/3 | | | 43.5 | | | |
| 277.5 | | | 277.5 | | | | |
| 279.4 | | 11 | | | 10 | 11 | 12 |
| 280.0 | 28 | | 280 | 44 | | | |
| 283.3̅ | 28 1/3 | | | 44.5 | | | |
| 283.63̅ | | 11 1/6 | | | 10.5 | 11.5 | 12.5 |
| 285.0 | | | 285 | | | | |
| 286.6̅ | 28 2/3 | | | 45 | | | |
| 287.86̅ | | 11 1/3 | | | 11 | 12 | 13 |
| 290.0 | 29 | | 290 | 45.5 | | | |
| 292.1 | | 11 1/2 | | | 11.5 | 12.5 | 13.5 |
| 292.5 | | | 292.5 | | | | |
| 293.3̅ | 29 1/3 | | | 46 | | | |
| 295.0 | | | 295 | | | | |
| 296.3̅ | | 11 2/3 | | | 12 | 13 | 14 |
| 296.6̅ | 29 2/3 | | | 46.5 | | | |
| 300.0 | 30 | | 300 | 47 | | | |
| 300.56̅ | | 11 5/6 | | | 12.5 | 13.5 | 14.5 |
| 303.3̅ | 30 1/3 | | | 47.5 | | | |
| 304.8 | | 12 | | | 13 | 14 | 15 |
| 305.0 | | | 305 | | | | |
| 306.6̅ | 30 2/3 | | | 48 | | | |
| 307.5 | | | 307.5 | | | | |
| 309.03̅ | | 12 1/6 | | | 13.5 | 14.5 | 15.5 |
| 310.0 | 31 | | 310 | 48.5 | | | |
| 313.26̅ | | 12 1/3 | | | 14 | 15 | 16 |
| 313.3̅ | 31 1/3 | | | 49 | | | |
| 315.0 | | | 315 | | | | |
| 316.6̅ | 31 2/3 | | | 49.5 | | | |
| 317.5 | | 12 1/2 | | | 14.5 | 15.5 | 16.5 |
| 320.0 | 32 | | 320 | 50 | | | |
| 321.73̅ | | 12 2/3 | | | 15 | 16 | 17 |
| mm | cm | inch | 5.0 mm | 6.6̅ mm | 8.46̅ mm = 1/3 inch | | |
| Foot length | | | Mondopoint | EUR | UK | US Men | US Women |

==== Size equivalence table, children ====

Children's shoe sizes
| Foot length | | | Mondopoint | EUR | UK | US | |
| (mm) | (cm) | (inch) | 5.0 mm | 6.6̅ mm | 8.46̅ mm = 1/3 inch | | |
|---|---|---|---|---|---|---|---|
| 118.53̅ | | 4 2/3 | | 19.5 | 3.5 | 4 | |
| 120 | 12 | 4 3/4 | 120 | 20 | 4 | 4.5 | |
| 123.3̅ | 12 1/3 | 4 5/6 | 125 | 20.5 | 4.5 | 5 | |
| 126.6̅ | 12 2/3 | 5 | | 21 | 5 | 5.5 | |
| 130 | 13 | 5 1/12 | 130 | 21.5 | 5.5 | | |
| 133.3̅ | 13 1/3 | 5 1/4 | | 22 | | 6 | |
| 136.6̅ | 13 2/3 | 5 1/3 | 135 | 22.5 | 6 | 6.5 | |
| 139.7 | 14 | 5 1/2 | 140 | 23 | 6.5 | | |
| 141.816̅ | | 5 7/12 | | | | 7 | |
| 143.3̅ | 14 1/3 | 5 2/3 | | 23.5 | 7 | 7.5 | |
| 146.6̅ | 14 2/3 | 5 3/4 | 145 | 24 | 7.5 | | |
| 150 | 15 | 5 11/12 | 150 | 24.5 | | 8 | |
| 153.3̅ | 15 1/3 | 6 | 155 | 25 | 8 | 8.5 | |
| 156.6̅ | 15 2/3 | 6 1/6 | | 25.5 | 8.5 | 9 | |
| 160 | 16 | 6 1/3 | 160 | 26 | 9 | | |
| 163.3̅ | 16 1/3 | 6 5/12 | | 26.5 | | 9.5 | |
| 166.6̅ | 16 2/3 | 6 7/12 | 165 | 27 | 9.5 | 10 | |
| 170 | 17 | 6 2/3 | 170 | 27.5 | 10 | 10.5 | |
| 173.3̅ | 17 1/3 | 6 5/6 | | 28 | 10.5 | 11 | |
| 176.6̅ | 17 2/3 | 7 | 175 | 28.5 | 11 | 11.5 | |
| 180 | 18 | 7 1/12 | 180 | 29 | 11.5 | | |
| 183.3̅ | 18 1/3 | 7 1/4 | | 29.5 | | 12 | |
| 186.6̅ | 18 2/3 | 7 1/3 | 185 | 30 | 12 | 12.5 | |
| 190 | 19 | 7 1/2 | 190 | 30.5 | 12.5 | 13 | |
| 192.616̅ | 19 1/3 | 7 7/12 | | 31 | 13 | 13.5 | |
| 196.6̅ | 19 2/3 | 7 3/4 | 195 | 31.5 | 13.5 | (1) | (2) |
| 200 | 20 | 7 5/6 | 200 | 32 | (0.5) | (1.5) | (2.5) |
| 203.3̅ | 20 1/3 | 8 | 205 | 32.5 | (1) | (2) | (3) |
| 206.6̅ | 20 2/3 | | | 33 | (1.5) | (2.5) | (3.5) |
| 210 | 21 | | 210 | 33.5 | (2) | (3) | (4) |
| (mm) | (cm) | (inch) | 5.0 mm | 6.6̅7̅ mm | 8.46̅ mm = 1/3 inch | | |
| Foot length | | | Mondopoint | EUR | (UK Adult) | (US Men) | (US Women) |

==== US and UK size data to be merged ====
The table below assumes a last length of foot length + 2/3 inches. UK children shoe sizes start at 3 1/4 inches for 0, while US children sizes start at 3 1/3 inches for 0, for a difference of 3 1/12 inches. Both systems end at 13.5.

UK and US children's shoe sizes
| Last length | | Foot length/Brannock | | UK sizes | US sizes |
| (in) | (mm) | (in) | (mm) | Children's | Children's |
|---|---|---|---|---|---|
| 3 11/12 | 99.483̅ | 3 1/4 | 82.55 | | 0 |
| 4 | 101.6 | 3 1/3 | 84.66̅ | 0 | |
| 4 1/12 | 103.716̅ | 3 5/12 | 86.783̅ | | 0.5 |
| 4 1/6 | 105.83̅ | 3 1/2 | 88.9 | 0.5 | |
| 4 1/4 | 107.95 | 3 7/12 | 91.016̅ | | 1 |
| 4 1/3 | 110.06̅ | 3 2/3 | 93.13̅ | 1 | |
| 4 5/12 | 112.183̅ | 3 3/4 | 95.25 | | 1.5 |
| 4 1/2 | 114.3 | 3 5/6 | 97.35̅ | 1.5 | |
| 4 7/12 | 115.71̅ | 3 11/12 | 99.483̅ | | 2 |
| 4 2/3 | 118.53̅ | 4 | 101.6 | 2 | |
| 4 3/4 | 120.65 | 4 1/12 | 103.716̅ | | 2.5 |
| 4 5/6 | 122.76̅ | 4 1/6 | 105.83̅ | 2.5 | |
| 4 11/12 | 124.883̅ | 4 1/4 | 107.95 | | 3 |
| 5 | 127.0 | 4 1/3 | 110.06̅ | 3 | |
| 5 1/12 | 129.116̅ | 4 5/12 | 112.183̅ | | 3.5 |
| 5 1/6 | 131.23̅ | 4 1/2 | 114.3 | 3.5 | |
| 5 1/4 | 133.35 | 4 7/12 | 116.416̅ | | 4 |
| 5 1/3 | 135.46̅ | 4 2/3 | 118.53̅ | 4 | |
| 5 5/12 | 137.583̅ | 4 3/4 | 120.65 | | 4.5 |
| 5 1/2 | 139.7 | 4 5/6 | 122.76̅ | 4.5 | |
| 5 7/12 | 141.816̅ | 4 11/12 | 124.883̅ | | 5 |
| 5 2/3 | 143.93̅ | 5 | 127.0 | 5 | |
| 5 3/4 | 146.05 | 5 1/12 | 129.116̅ | | 5.5 |
| 5 5/6 | 148.16̅ | 5 1/6 | 131.23̅ | 5.5 | |
| 5 11/12 | 150.283̅ | 5 1/4 | 133.35 | | 6 |
| 6 | 152.4 | 5 1/3 | 135.46̅ | 6 | |
| 6 1/12 | 154.516̅ | 5 5/12 | 137.583̅ | | 6.5 |
| 6 1/6 | 156.63̅ | 5 1/2 | 139.7 | 6.5 | |
| 6 1/4 | 158.75 | 5 7/12 | 141.816̅ | | 7 |
| 6 1/3 | 160.86̅ | 5 2/3 | 143.92̅ | 7 | |
| 6 5/12 | 162.983̅ | 5 3/4 | 146.05 | | 7.5 |
| 6 1/2 | 165.1 | 5 5/6 | 148.16̅ | 7.5 | |
| 6 7/12 | 167.216̅ | 5 11/12 | 150.283̅ | | 8 |
| 6 2/3 | 169.3̅ | 6 | 152.4 | 8 | |
| 6 3/4 | 171.45 | 6 1/12 | 154.516̅ | | 8.5 |
| 6 5/6 | 173.56̅ | 6 1/6 | 156.63̅ | 8.5 | |
| 6 11/12 | 173.56̅ | 6 1/4 | 158.75 | | 9 |
| 7 | 177.8 | 6 1/3 | 160.86̅ | 9 | |
| 7 1/12 | 179.913̅ | 6 5/12 | 162.983̅ | | 9.5 |
| 7 1/6 | 182.03̅ | 6 1/2 | 165.1 | 9.5 | |
| 7 1/4 | 183.4̅ | 6 7/12 | 166.51̅ | | 10 |
| 7 1/3 | 186.26̅ | 6 2/3 | 169.3̅ | 10 | |
| 7 5/12 | 188.383̅ | 6 3/4 | 170.45 | | 10.5 |
| 7 1/2 | 190.5 | 6 5/6 | 173.56̅ | 10.5 | |
| 7 7/12 | 192.616̅ | 6 11/12 | 174.97̅ | | 11 |
| 7 2/3 | 194.73̅ | 7 | 177.8 | 11 | |
| 7 3/4 | 196.85 | 7 1/12 | 179.916̅ | | 11.5 |
| 7 5/6 | 198.96̅ | 7 1/6 | 182.03̅ | 11.5 | |
| 7 11/12 | 201.083̅ | 7 1/4 | 184.15 | | 12 |
| 8 | 203.2 | 7 1/3 | 186.26̅ | 12 | |
| 8 1/12 | 205.315̅ | 7 5/12 | 188.383̅ | | 12.5 |
| 8 1/6 | 207.43̅ | 7 1/2 | 190.5 | 12.5 | |
| 8 1/4 | 209.5 | 7 7/12 | 192.616̅ | | 13 |
| 8 1/3 | 211.6̅ | 7 2/3 | 194.73̅ | 13 | |
| 8 5/12 | 213.783̅ | 7 3/4 | 196.85 | | 13.5 |
| 8 1/2 | 215.9 | 7 5/6 | 198.96̅ | 13.5 | |
| (in) | (mm) | (in) | (mm) | Children's | Children's |
| Last length | | Foot length/Brannock | | UK sizes | US sizes |

This following table includes UK and US adult shoe sizes before the starting point of the adult equivalence table (210 mm). Parenthesized values indicate children sizes.

UK and US adult shoe sizes under 210 mm
| Last length | | Foot length/Brannock | | UK sizes | US sizes | |
| (in) | (mm) | (in) | (mm) | Adults' | Men's | Women's |
|---|---|---|---|---|---|---|
| 8 | 203.2 | 7 1/3 | 186.26̅ | (12) | (12.25) | 1 |
| 8 1/6 | 207.43̅ | 7 1/2 | 190.5 | (12.5) | (12.75) | 1.5 |
| 8 1/3 | 211.6̅ | 7 2/3 | 194.73̅ | 0 (13) | 1 (13.25) | 2 |
| 8 1/2 | 215.9 | 7 5/6 | 198.96̅ | 0.5 (13.5) | 1.5 | 2.5 |
| 8 2/3 | 220.13̅ | 8 | 203.2 | 1 | 2 | 3 |
| 8 5/6 | 224.36̅ | 8 1/6 | 207.43̅ | 1.5 | 2.5 | 3.5 |
| 9 | 228.6 | 8 1/3 | 211.6̅ | 2 | 3 | 4 |

=== Size marking ===
It is recommended to include size marking in each of the four sizing systems on the shoe label and on the package. The principal system used for manufacturing the shoe needs to be placed first and emphasized with a boldface.

The standard includes quick conversion tables for adult shoe size marking; they provide matching sizes for shoes marked in Mondopoint, European, and UK systems. When converted values require rounding, they are rounded to a larger shoe size rather than a smaller one, to increase comfort.

Mondopoint conversion
| Mondo | EUR | UK | US | |
| Mondo | EUR | UK | Men | Women |
|---|---|---|---|---|
| 215 | 34 | 2.5 | 3.5 | 4.5 |
| 220 | 35 | 3 | 4 | 5 |
| 225 | 35.5 | 3.5 | 4.5 | 5.5 |
| 230 | 36.5 | 4 | 5 | 6 |
| 235 | 37 | 4.5 | 5.5 | 6.5 |
| 240 | 38 | 5.5 | 6.5 | 7.5 |
| 245 | 38.5 | 6 | 7 | 8 |
| 250 | 39.5 | 6.5 | 7.5 | 8.5 |
| 255 | 40 | 7 | 8 | 9 |
| 260 | 41 | 7.5 | 8.5 | 9.5 |
| 265 | 41.5 | 8.5 | 9.5 | 10.5 |
| 270 | 42.5 | 9 | 10 | 11 |
| 275 | 43 | 9.5 | 10.5 | 11.5 |
| 280 | 44 | 10 | 11 | 12 |
| 285 | 44.5 | 10.5 | 11.5 | 12.5 |
| 290 | 45.5 | 11 | 12 | 13 |
| 295 | 46 | 12 | 13 | 14 |
| 300 | 47 | 12.5 | 13.5 | 14.5 |
| 305 | 47.5 | 13 | 14 | 15 |
| 310 | 48.5 | 13.5 | 14.5 | 15.5 |
| 315 | 49 | 14 | 15 | 16 |
| 320 | 50 | 15 | 16 | 17 |

European shoe size conversion
| EUR | Mondo | UK | US | |
| EUR | Mondo | UK | Men | Women |
|---|---|---|---|---|
| 34 | 215 | 2 | 3 | 4 |
| 34.5 | 215 | 2.5 | 3.5 | 4.5 |
| 35 | 220 | 3 | 4 | 5 |
| 35.5 | 225 | 3.5 | 4.5 | 5.5 |
| 36 | 225 | 4 | 5 | 6 |
| 36.5 | 230 | 4 | 5 | 6 |
| 37 | 235 | 4.5 | 5.5 | 6.5 |
| 37.5 | 235 | 5 | 6 | 7 |
| 38 | 240 | 5.5 | 6.5 | 7.5 |
| 38.5 | 245 | 5.5 | 6.5 | 7.5 |
| 39 | 245 | 6 | 7 | 8 |
| 39.5 | 250 | 6.5 | 7.5 | 8.5 |
| 40 | 255 | 7 | 8 | 9 |
| 40.5 | 255 | 7.5 | 8.5 | 9.5 |
| 41 | 260 | 7.5 | 8.5 | 9.5 |
| 41.5 | 265 | 8 | 9 | 10 |
| 42 | 265 | 8.5 | 9.5 | 10.5 |
| 42.5 | 270 | 9 | 10 | 11 |
| 43 | 275 | 9.5 | 10.5 | 11.5 |
| 43.5 | 275 | 9.5 | 10.5 | 11.5 |
| 44 | 280 | 10 | 11 | 12 |
| 44.5 | 285 | 10.5 | 11.5 | 12.5 |
| 45 | 285 | 11 | 12 | 13 |
| 45.5 | 290 | 11.5 | 12.5 | 13.5 |
| 46 | 295 | 11.5 | 12.5 | 13.5 |
| 46.5 | 295 | 12 | 13 | 14 |
| 47 | 300 | 12.5 | 13.5 | 14.5 |
| 47.5 | 305 | 13 | 14 | 15 |
| 48 | 305 | 13 | 14 | 15 |
| 48.5 | 310 | 13.5 | 14.5 | 15.5 |
| 49 | 315 | 14 | 15 | 16 |
| 49.5 | 315 | 14.5 | 15.5 | 16.5 |
| 50 | 320 | 15 | 16 | 17 |

United Kingdom shoe size conversion
| UK | Mondo | EUR | US | |
| UK | Mondo | EUR | Men | Women |
|---|---|---|---|---|
| 2 | 210 | 34 | 3 | 4 |
| 2.5 | 215 | 34.5 | 3.5 | 4.5 |
| 3 | 220 | 35 | 4 | 5 |
| 3.5 | 225 | 35.5 | 4.5 | 5.5 |
| 4 | 230 | 36.5 | 5 | 6 |
| 4.5 | 235 | 37 | 5.5 | 6.5 |
| 5 | 235 | 37.5 | 6 | 7 |
| 5.5 | 240 | 38 | 6.5 | 7.5 |
| 6 | 245 | 39 | 7 | 8 |
| 6.5 | 250 | 39.5 | 7.5 | 8.5 |
| 7 | 255 | 40 | 8 | 9 |
| 7.5 | 260 | 40.5 | 8.5 | 9.5 |
| 8 | 260 | 41.5 | 9 | 10 |
| 8.5 | 265 | 42 | 9.5 | 10.5 |
| 9 | 270 | 42.5 | 10 | 11 |
| 9.5 | 275 | 43.5 | 10.5 | 11.5 |
| 10 | 280 | 44 | 11 | 12 |
| 10.5 | 285 | 44.5 | 11.5 | 12.5 |
| 11 | 290 | 45.5 | 12 | 13 |
| 11.5 | 290 | 46 | 12.5 | 13.5 |
| 12 | 295 | 46.5 | 13 | 14 |
| 12.5 | 300 | 47 | 13.5 | 14.5 |
| 13 | 305 | 47.5 | 14 | 15 |
| 13.5 | 310 | 48.5 | 14.5 | 15.5 |
| 14 | 315 | 49 | 15 | 16 |
| 14.5 | 320 | 49.5 | 15.5 | 16.5 |
| 15 | 320 | 50 | 16 | 17 |

== See also ==
- Clothing sizes
- List of shoe styles
- Shoes
- Toddler shoes, shoes for children aged 1 to 3 years
