= Brannock =

Brannock may refer to:

- Brannoc of Braunton or Saint Brannock, a 6th-century Christian saint associated with North Devon
- Charles F. Brannock (1903 – 1992), shoe salesman and inventor of the Brannock Device
- Mike Brannock (1851 – 1881), American baseball player
- Brannock High School, Motherwell, Scotland
- Brannock Device, a shoe-size measuring instrument
- Brannock, County Armagh, a townland in County Armagh, Northern Ireland

== See also ==
- Brannoch (disambiguation)
