= Titaua Juventin =

Tahitian athletics administrator

Titaua Juventin (also Juventin-Maurin) is an athletics administrator from French Polynesia. She is the president of the Athletics Federation of French Polynesia and represents Tahiti on the Oceania Athletics Association.

== Life ==
Juventin works in teacher training with the Ministry of Education in Tahiti. She adapted the International Association of Athletics Federations’ children’s athletics programme for the specific needs of French Polynesian communities and also introduced a programme aimed at getting toddlers physically active and making sport a regular part of a family lifestyle.

Juventin has served as treasurer of the Oceania Athletics Association Council for three terms and is also a member of IAAF Youth Commission.
