= Toddler shoes =

Shoes designed for children 1 to 3 years of age

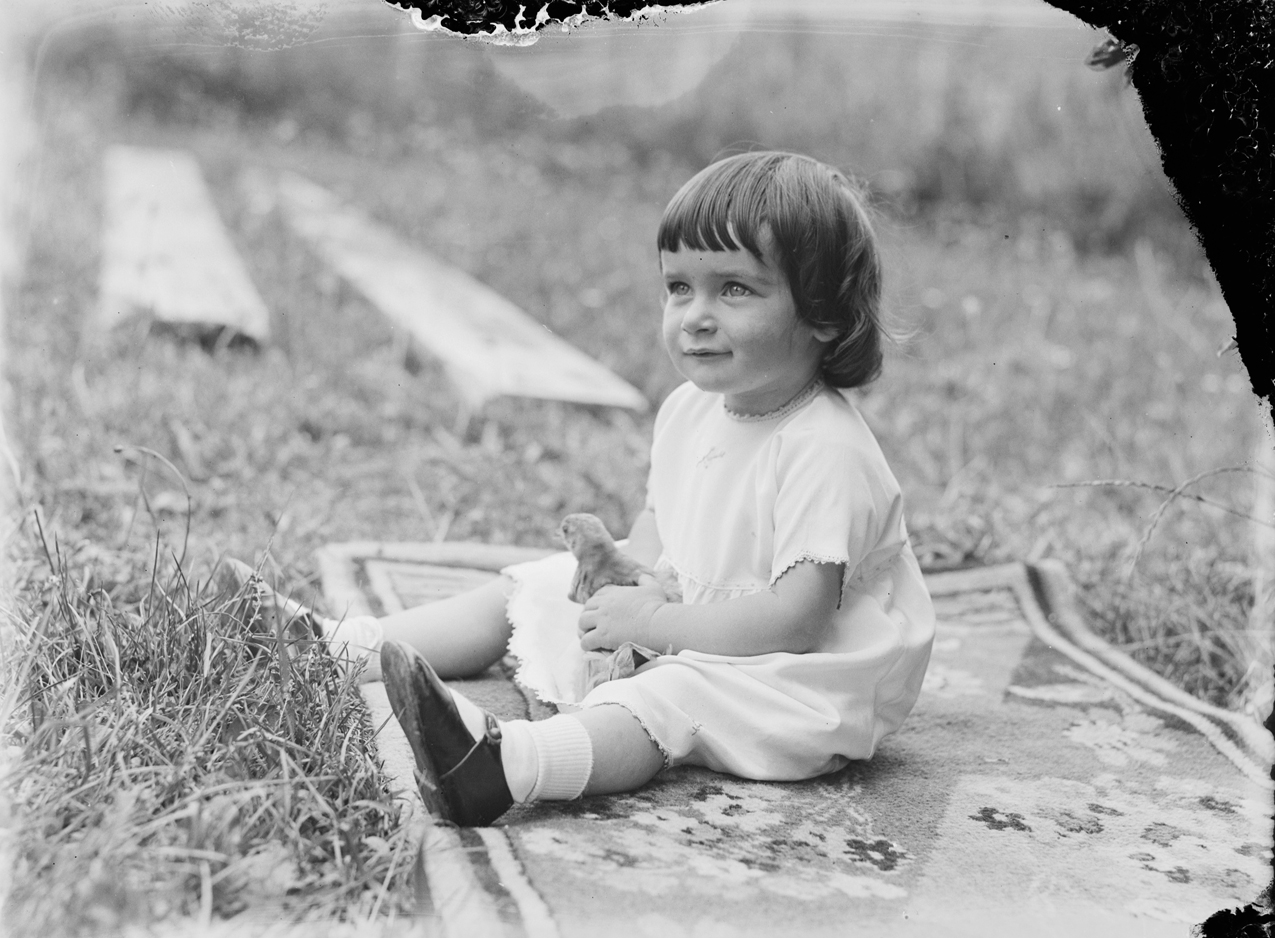
Toddler with shoes (1940s)

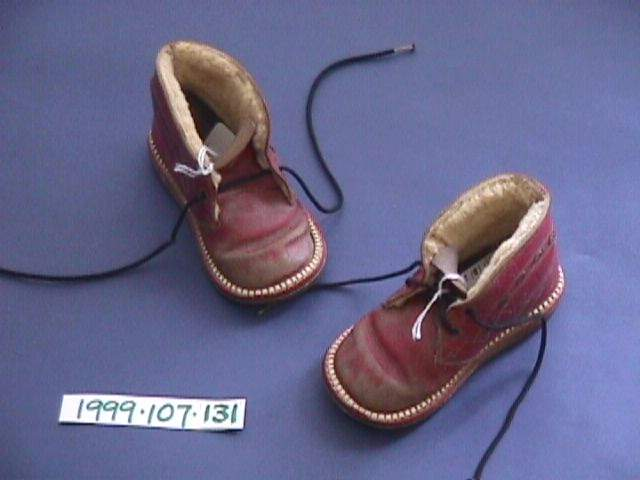
Toddler shoes from the 1970s

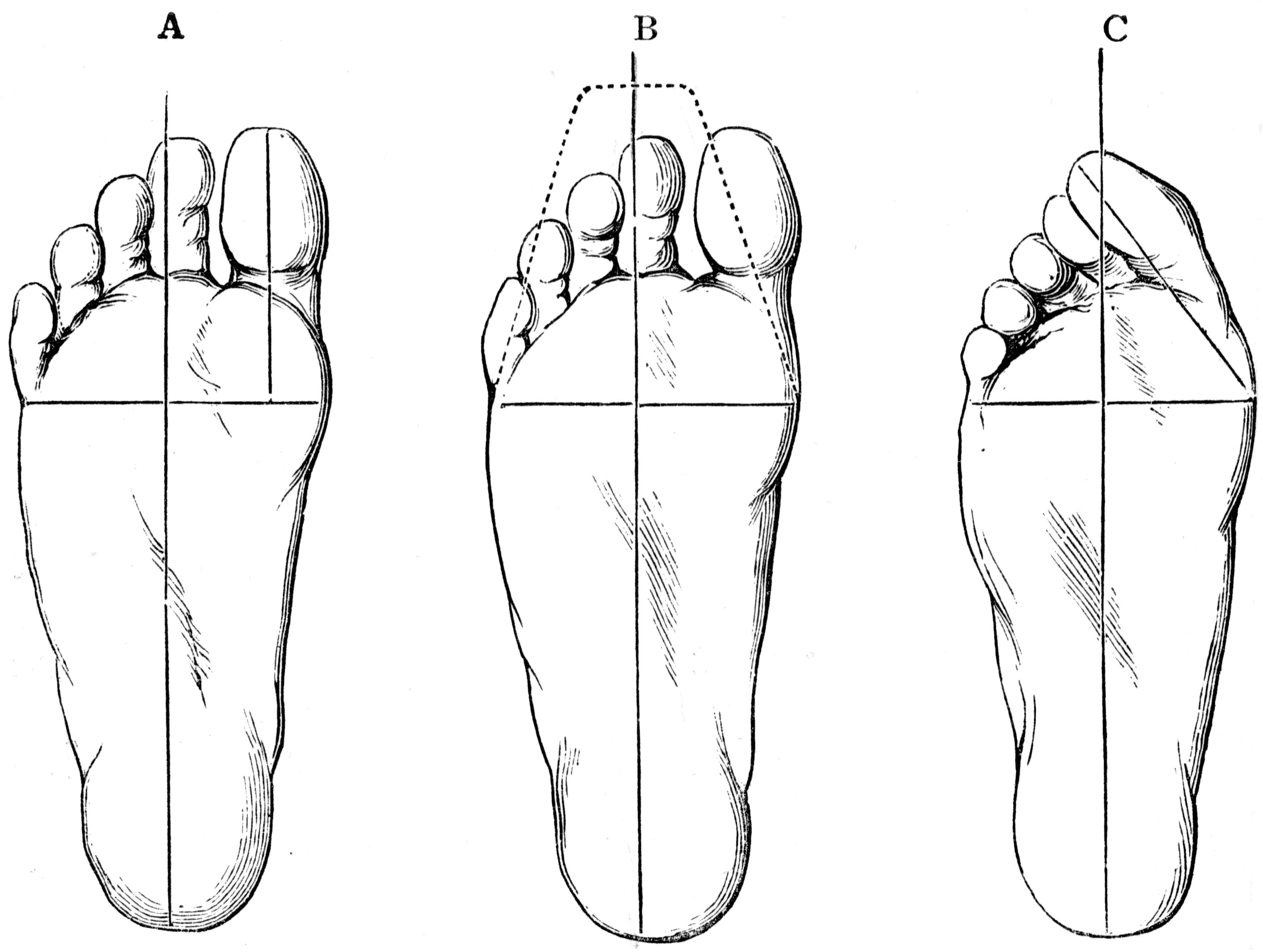
Normal and deformed feet due to too tight shoes

Toddler shoes are shoes designed and marketed for toddlers, i.e. children between the ages of 1 and 3. They may be appropriate when children start kindergarten and learn to walk. Toddler shoes are used primarily for protection and warmth in cold weather, and should be ergonomic and have a good fit. It is important that the shoes are not too small.

Shoes are not a natural part of the body. There is a widespread misconception used in marketing that shoes give children better balance and coordination, and are thus an aid for them to learn to walk. However, it is recommended that the amount of shoe wear among young children be limited. From a functional perspective children should not need shoes, but hazardous modern environments make them necessary according to Mike O'Neill, an orthopedist and spokesman for the British Society of Chiropodists and Podiatrists. In any case, children do not need shoes until they can walk on their own and need to walk outdoors. In general, excessive early use of shoes can negatively affect foot development, and research has shown that children who walk more barefoot learn to walk faster, develop the muscles and ligaments of the foot better, and have better posture, balance and the ability to orient themselves. According to Ingvil Øien, senior lecturer in the physiotherapy program at Oslo University College, young children under the age of 2 should "go barefoot indoors as much as possible, when the environment or temperature makes it difficult to leave their shoes outside". It can be beneficial to wear as few shoes as possible when situations allow, such as indoors and during many outdoor activities in the summer. Walking barefoot helps stimulate the muscles under the foot.

Some shoes are designed for kids who are still crawling, and they usually have a thinner sole than ordinary shoes. These are only meant for warmth and protection, but children who crawl will often benefit more from anti-slip socks or being barefoot.

== Development of motor skills ==
On average, children are able to walk independently at around 13 months of age, with a normal range between 9-18 months. Gait continues to change, and the way a child walks is usually not fully developed until the age of 7. Women's feet continue to grow until they are around 13 years old, while men's feet continue to grow until they are around 15 years old. Feet are not fully ossified until they are 20 years old, and are therefore soft and malleable. It is therefore important to have adequate space in socks and shoes throughout childhood, but especially in the beginning.

== Sizing ==
It is usually recommended that footwear be approximately 10 mm to 15 mm longer than the foot, but shoes should not be larger than this. Some recommend 10 mm of excess length for summer shoes, and 15 mm of excess length for winter shoes. Both feet should be measured, and the size should be selected based on the largest foot, and the longest toe.

Example: With an excess length of 15 mm, there is 3 mm for toe rounding (the bend at the tip of the shoe), 5 mm for sliding length (so that the foot can move inside the shoe) and 7 mm for growth allowance.

=== Measuring the length of the foot ===
The foot can be measured by placing a sheet of paper on the floor against a wall without moldings, placing the child's foot against the wall, and drawing along the child's toes (should be done in the evening because feet naturally swell and become larger throughout the day due to prolonged activity, heat, and fluid retention).

The distance in millimeters is the shoe size in mondopoint (the international system), and this can be converted to Paris points ("euro size"). Another way to check the size is to remove the insole and place the child's foot on the sole in an upright position, but it should also be checked how the sole fits inside the shoe. Some shoes have their corresponding soles marked with lines to help see if the shoe is big enough.

Mondo (INT)	Shoe (foot+15 mm)	Paris point (EUR)	UK size	Typical age
85 mm	100	15		Newborn
92 mm	107	16	1 (baby)	3-6 months
100 mm	115	17		6-9 months
101 mm		17.5	2	
107 mm	122	18	2.5	12 months
109 mm		18.5	3	
113 mm	128	19	3.5	1-2 years
120 mm	135	20	4 (baby)	1-2 years
122 mm		20.5	4.5 (toddler)	
126 mm			5	
127 mm	142	21		1-2 years
133 mm	148	22	5.5	1-3 years
140 mm	155	23	6	2-3 years
147 mm	162	24	7	2-3 years
153 mm	168	25		3-5 years
160 mm	175	26	9	3-5 years
167 mm	182	27		3-7 years
169 mm		27	9.5 (toddler)	
173 mm	188	28	10 (child)	5-7 years
180 mm	195	29		5-7 years
187 mm	202	30		6-7 years
193 mm	208	31		6-8 years
200 mm	215	32	1	7-8 years
207 mm	222	33		7-8 years
213 mm	228	34	2.5	8-12 years
220 mm	235	35		8-12 years
227 mm	242	36	4	8-12 years
233 mm	248	37		
240 mm	255	38	5.5	

=== Foot width ===
It is recommended to have room for 4 mm or 5 mm on each side of the foot.

=== Toe height ===
It is also important that there is enough room for the foot heightwise.

=== Regularity of measurements ===
Advice from the British College of Podiatry recommends that children under the age of 4 should ideally have their feet measured every 8 weeks. Due to growth children may be at points wearing the wrong sized shoe. Parents or carers need to monitor and regularly check that the shoes still fit well. Children have soft, flexible toes and so do not necessarily feel pain when the shoe is too small. How quickly children grow varies from person to person, and children's feet can grow in quickly or slowly in periods. According to Viking Footwear, feet can grow 20 mm per year from the age of 1 year, and 15 mm per year from the age of 2 years and the following years,while according to the Løp- og idrettsklinikken, children's feet can grow up to 20 mm in just six months.

Parents or carers should ensure that the child fastens the shoes properly, and should teach the child to tie shoelaces or use velcro straps so that the shoe fits snugly around the foot. Velcro or t-bars are ideal for a good fit. For children who may find tying laces difficult then silicone laces, toggles and elastic can help children become more independent in fastening shoes.

== Ergonomics ==
Children's feet are soft, and therefore children should not wear shoes that are too stiff.

Some checkpoints for good ergonomics are that the shoes:

- Have the right length, width, and toe height. Slightly wide front allows room for toes to spread naturally.
- Has adjustable closure so it can be adjusted to the foot
- Are soft and lightweight so that they follow the surface and the natural curvature of the foot. The shoe should be slightly flexible in the middle, and more flexible at the balls of the toes.
- Are not easy to twist, as it provides poor stability.
- Have plenty of room in the toe area, and should not pinch the foot in any places
- Supports around the ankles. Firm and hard heel cap (the back part of the shoe) provides guidance and support while walking, and makes the shoe more stable.
- Has good grip on the surface
- Breathes well, as children sweat a lot on their feet during a day of activity. This should be considered against water-repellent properties that can make the shoes more waterproof.

== Wear and inheritance ==
New shoes mold to the wearer. It is not recommended to inherit well-worn shoes, but one may consider inheriting shoes if they have no visible wear and are equipped with new insoles. Worn shoes that are uneven should not be inherited.

== See also ==
- Shoe size, units of measurement for the size of shoes, for example in millimeters or Paris Points (length unit of 2/3 cm)
