= Toddler Story King =

Chinese children's literary publication

Toddler Story King 幼儿故事大王
- Frequency: Monthly
- Founded: 1994
- Based in: Hangzhou
- ISSN: 1006-3579

Toddler Story King or You'er gushi dawang (Chinese: 幼儿故事大王), also known as King of Stories for Kindergartners, is a simplified Chinese literary publication for toddler readers.

Toddler Story King was launched in 1994 in Hangzhou with the ISSN number ISSN 1006-3579.

Toddler Story King was sponsored by the Zhejiang Juvenile And Children's Publishing House (浙江少年儿童出版社) and published in Chinese by the Editorial Department of Kindergarten Story King (幼儿故事大王编辑部).
