= Holophrasis =

Prelinguistic use of a single word to express a complex idea

In the study of language acquisition, holophrasis is the prelinguistic use of a single word to express a complex idea. A holophrase may resemble an interjection, but whereas an interjection is linguistic, and has a specific grammatical function, a holophrase is simply a vocalization memorized by rote and used without grammatical intent.

== In toddlers ==
Toddlers pass through a holophrastic stage early in life, during which they are able to communicate complex ideas using only single words and simple fixed expressions. As an example, the word "food" might be used to mean "Give me food" and the word "up" could convey "Pick me up".

Combined with body language, context, and tone of voice, holophrasis is usually sufficient to express a child's needs. Indeed, it is based almost entirely on context.

One interesting feature of holophrasis is its economy, and its emphasis on certainty rather than conceptual completeness. When expressing a complex idea, a child will often omit the more familiar concepts and use only the most recently learned word. For instance, when requesting a ball, a child is far more likely to specify "ball" than "want".

Although holophrasis is non-grammatical, it forms the foundation of a child's vocabulary.

== Linguistics ==
In linguistics, holophrasis is the use of a single word to form a whole sentence, notably in polysynthetic languages. It can also be a sentence composed of a single word, for example Polish Pada. "It's raining", or English "Thanks".
