= Paris point =

Unit of length used for shoe sizes

- Unit of: Length
- Symbol: Paris point

Conversions
1 Paris point in ...	... is equal to ...
- SI units: 2/3 cm
- Imperial and US customary: 0.262 in

The Paris point is a unit of length defined as 2/3 centimetre (6.67 mm; 0.262 in). It is commonly used for shoe sizes in Continental Europe.

The unit was invented by French shoemakers in the early 1800s. Its origin probably lies in 2/3 centimetre being very close to 1/4 inch; a French inch pouce-roi is around 27 mm, a quarter of that is 6.7 mm, close to 6.6̅ mm defined for the Paris point.

== See also ==
- Point (disambiguation)
- Barleycorn (unit), used in the English shoe sizing system.
