= Brannock Device =

Shoe size measuring instrument

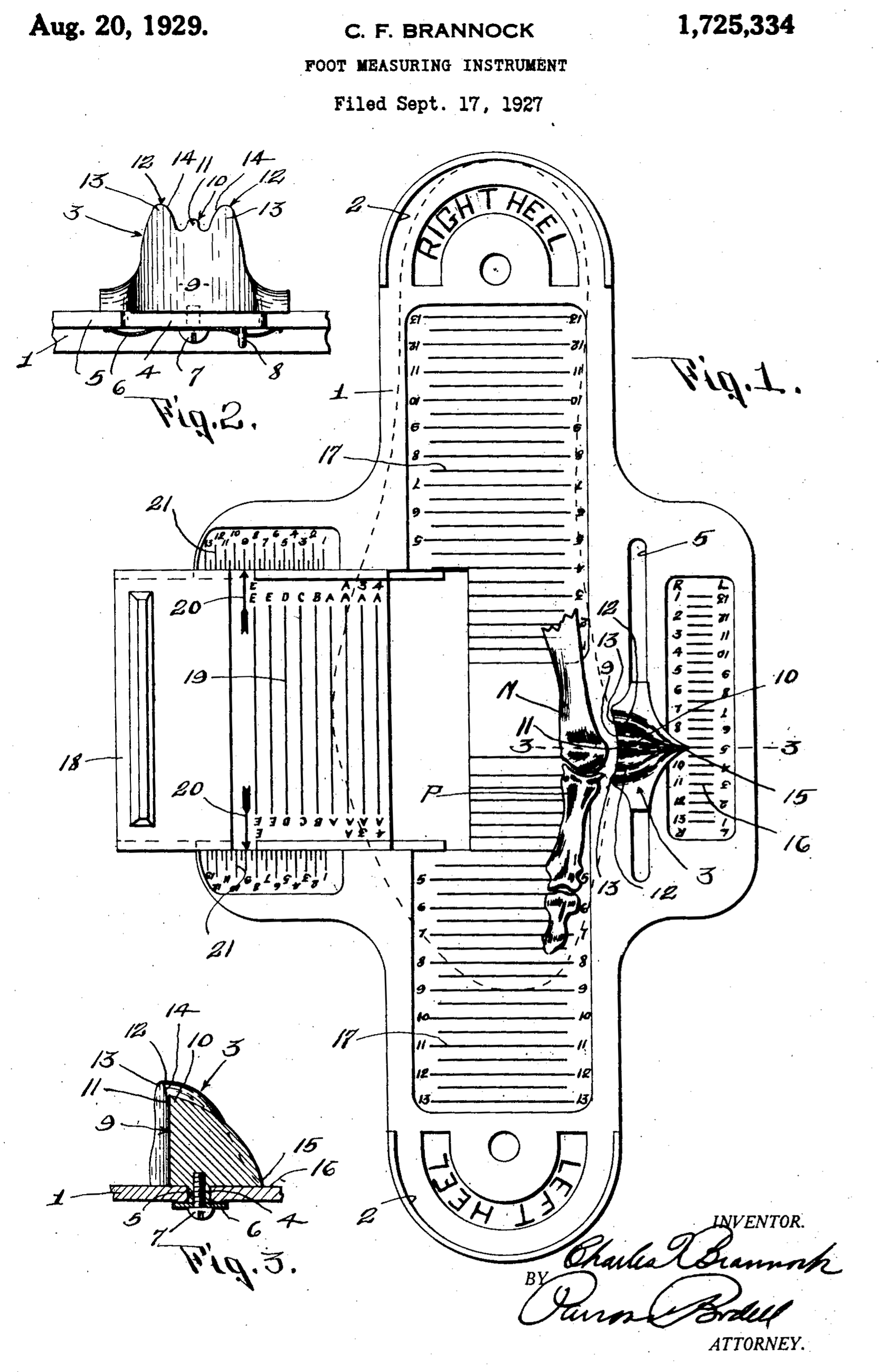
Brannock Device

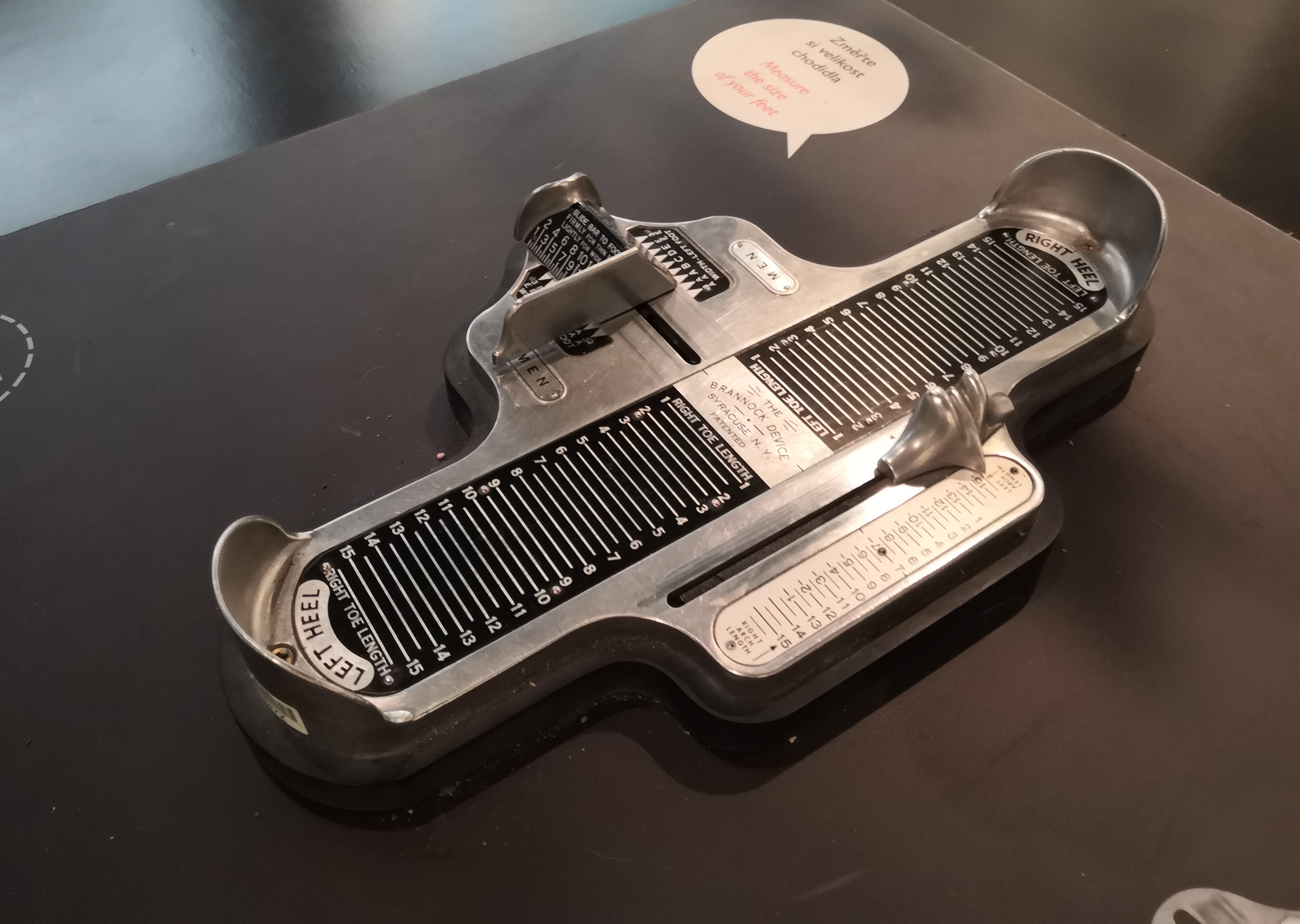
Brannock Device at shoe museum in Zlín, Czechia

The Brannock Device is a measuring instrument invented by Charles F. Brannock for measuring a person's shoe size. Brannock spent two years developing a simple means of measuring the length, width, and arch length of the human foot. He eventually improved on the wooden RITZ Stick, the industry standard of the day, patenting his first prototype in 1925 and an improved version in 1927. The device has both left and right heel cups and is rotated through 180 degrees to measure the second foot. Brannock later formed the Brannock Device Company to manufacture and sell the product, and headed the company until 1992 when he died at age 89. The Smithsonian Institution has the nearly complete records of the development of the Brannock Device and subsequent marketing.

The Brannock Device Company was headquartered in Syracuse, New York, United States, until shortly after Charles Brannock's death. Salvatore Leonardi purchased the company from the Brannock Estate in 1993, and moved manufacturing to a small factory in Liverpool, New York.

On May 31, 2018, the Syracuse Chiefs, a minor league baseball team, had a one-night promotion and rebranded as the Syracuse Devices in honor of the Brannock Device.

== Sizing system ==
The modern Brannock device takes three measurements of each foot:

Foot length
the length from heel to the tip of the longest toe (in increments of barleycorns)
Arch length
the length from heel to the inside of the ball of the foot, or medial metatarsophalangeal joint
Width
the width of the foot perpendicular to the length

Foot and arch lengths correspond to numeric Brannock sizes, and foot widths correspond to letter Brannock widths AAAA (narrowest) to EEEE (widest), as follows:

$$\begin{align}
\text{foot length} & = 7\tfrac{1}{3}\text{ inches} + (\text{men's Brannock size} \times \tfrac{1}{3}\text{ inch}) \\
\text{arch length} & = 5\tfrac{18}{50}\text{ inches} + (\text{men's Brannock size} \times \tfrac{11}{50}\text{ inch}) \\
\text{width} & = 1\tfrac{10}{16}\text{ inches} + (\text{men's Brannock size} \times \tfrac{1}{8}\text{ inch}) + (\text{steps up from AAAA} \times \tfrac{3}{16}\text{ inch})
\end{align}$$

Women's Brannock sizes are offset from men's by one:

$$\text{women's Brannock size} = \text{men's Brannock size} + 1$$

Brannock men's size
1
1 1/2
2
2 1/2
3
3 1/2
4
4 1/2
5
5 1/2
6
6 1/2
7
7 1/2
8
8 1/2
9
9 1/2
10
10 1/2
11
11 1/2
12
12 1/2
13
13 1/2
14
14 1/2
15
15 1/2
16
16 1/2
17
17 1/2
18
18 1/2
19
19 1/2
20
20 1/2
21
21 1/2
22
22 1/2
23
23 1/2
24
24 1/2
25
25 1/2

Heel-to-toe (foot) length	Heel-to-ball (arch) length	AAAA	AAA	AA	A	B	C	D	E	EE	EEE	EEEE
7 2/3 inches (195 mm)	5 29/50 inches (142 mm)	1 3/4 inches (44 mm)	1 15/16 inches (49 mm)	2 1/8 inches (54 mm)	2 5/16 inches (59 mm)	2 1/2 inches (64 mm)	2 11/16 inches (68 mm)	2 7/8 inches (73 mm)	3 1/16 inches (78 mm)	3 1/4 inches (83 mm)	3 7/16 inches (87 mm)	3 5/8 inches (92 mm)
7 5/6 inches (199 mm)	5 69/100 inches (145 mm)	1 13/16 inches (46 mm)	2 inches (51 mm)	2 3/16 inches (56 mm)	2 3/8 inches (60 mm)	2 9/16 inches (65 mm)	2 3/4 inches (70 mm)	2 15/16 inches (75 mm)	3 1/8 inches (79 mm)	3 5/16 inches (84 mm)	3 1/2 inches (89 mm)	3 11/16 inches (94 mm)
8 inches (203 mm)	5 4/5 inches (147 mm)	1 7/8 inches (48 mm)	2 1/16 inches (52 mm)	2 1/4 inches (57 mm)	2 7/16 inches (62 mm)	2 5/8 inches (67 mm)	2 13/16 inches (71 mm)	3 inches (76 mm)	3 3/16 inches (81 mm)	3 3/8 inches (86 mm)	3 9/16 inches (90 mm)	3 3/4 inches (95 mm)
8 1/6 inches (207 mm)	5 91/100 inches (150 mm)	1 15/16 inches (49 mm)	2 1/8 inches (54 mm)	2 5/16 inches (59 mm)	2 1/2 inches (64 mm)	2 11/16 inches (68 mm)	2 7/8 inches (73 mm)	3 1/16 inches (78 mm)	3 1/4 inches (83 mm)	3 7/16 inches (87 mm)	3 5/8 inches (92 mm)	3 13/16 inches (97 mm)
8 1/3 inches (212 mm)	6 1/50 inches (153 mm)	2 inches (51 mm)	2 3/16 inches (56 mm)	2 3/8 inches (60 mm)	2 9/16 inches (65 mm)	2 3/4 inches (70 mm)	2 15/16 inches (75 mm)	3 1/8 inches (79 mm)	3 5/16 inches (84 mm)	3 1/2 inches (89 mm)	3 11/16 inches (94 mm)	3 7/8 inches (98 mm)
8 1/2 inches (216 mm)	6 13/100 inches (156 mm)	2 1/16 inches (52 mm)	2 1/4 inches (57 mm)	2 7/16 inches (62 mm)	2 5/8 inches (67 mm)	2 13/16 inches (71 mm)	3 inches (76 mm)	3 3/16 inches (81 mm)	3 3/8 inches (86 mm)	3 9/16 inches (90 mm)	3 3/4 inches (95 mm)	3 15/16 inches (100 mm)
8 2/3 inches (220 mm)	6 6/25 inches (158 mm)	2 1/8 inches (54 mm)	2 5/16 inches (59 mm)	2 1/2 inches (64 mm)	2 11/16 inches (68 mm)	2 7/8 inches (73 mm)	3 1/16 inches (78 mm)	3 1/4 inches (83 mm)	3 7/16 inches (87 mm)	3 5/8 inches (92 mm)	3 13/16 inches (97 mm)	4 inches (102 mm)
8 5/6 inches (224 mm)	6 7/20 inches (161 mm)	2 3/16 inches (56 mm)	2 3/8 inches (60 mm)	2 9/16 inches (65 mm)	2 3/4 inches (70 mm)	2 15/16 inches (75 mm)	3 1/8 inches (79 mm)	3 5/16 inches (84 mm)	3 1/2 inches (89 mm)	3 11/16 inches (94 mm)	3 7/8 inches (98 mm)	4 1/16 inches (103 mm)
9 inches (229 mm)	6 23/50 inches (164 mm)	2 1/4 inches (57 mm)	2 7/16 inches (62 mm)	2 5/8 inches (67 mm)	2 13/16 inches (71 mm)	3 inches (76 mm)	3 3/16 inches (81 mm)	3 3/8 inches (86 mm)	3 9/16 inches (90 mm)	3 3/4 inches (95 mm)	3 15/16 inches (100 mm)	4 1/8 inches (105 mm)
9 1/6 inches (233 mm)	6 57/100 inches (167 mm)	2 5/16 inches (59 mm)	2 1/2 inches (64 mm)	2 11/16 inches (68 mm)	2 7/8 inches (73 mm)	3 1/16 inches (78 mm)	3 1/4 inches (83 mm)	3 7/16 inches (87 mm)	3 5/8 inches (92 mm)	3 13/16 inches (97 mm)	4 inches (102 mm)	4 3/16 inches (106 mm)
9 1/3 inches (237 mm)	6 17/25 inches (170 mm)	2 3/8 inches (60 mm)	2 9/16 inches (65 mm)	2 3/4 inches (70 mm)	2 15/16 inches (75 mm)	3 1/8 inches (79 mm)	3 5/16 inches (84 mm)	3 1/2 inches (89 mm)	3 11/16 inches (94 mm)	3 7/8 inches (98 mm)	4 1/16 inches (103 mm)	4 1/4 inches (108 mm)
9 1/2 inches (241 mm)	6 79/100 inches (172 mm)	2 7/16 inches (62 mm)	2 5/8 inches (67 mm)	2 13/16 inches (71 mm)	3 inches (76 mm)	3 3/16 inches (81 mm)	3 3/8 inches (86 mm)	3 9/16 inches (90 mm)	3 3/4 inches (95 mm)	3 15/16 inches (100 mm)	4 1/8 inches (105 mm)	4 5/16 inches (110 mm)
9 2/3 inches (246 mm)	6 9/10 inches (175 mm)	2 1/2 inches (64 mm)	2 11/16 inches (68 mm)	2 7/8 inches (73 mm)	3 1/16 inches (78 mm)	3 1/4 inches (83 mm)	3 7/16 inches (87 mm)	3 5/8 inches (92 mm)	3 13/16 inches (97 mm)	4 inches (102 mm)	4 3/16 inches (106 mm)	4 3/8 inches (111 mm)
9 5/6 inches (250 mm)	7 1/100 inches (178 mm)	2 9/16 inches (65 mm)	2 3/4 inches (70 mm)	2 15/16 inches (75 mm)	3 1/8 inches (79 mm)	3 5/16 inches (84 mm)	3 1/2 inches (89 mm)	3 11/16 inches (94 mm)	3 7/8 inches (98 mm)	4 1/16 inches (103 mm)	4 1/4 inches (108 mm)	4 7/16 inches (113 mm)
10 inches (254 mm)	7 3/25 inches (181 mm)	2 5/8 inches (67 mm)	2 13/16 inches (71 mm)	3 inches (76 mm)	3 3/16 inches (81 mm)	3 3/8 inches (86 mm)	3 9/16 inches (90 mm)	3 3/4 inches (95 mm)	3 15/16 inches (100 mm)	4 1/8 inches (105 mm)	4 5/16 inches (110 mm)	4 1/2 inches (114 mm)
10 1/6 inches (258 mm)	7 23/100 inches (184 mm)	2 11/16 inches (68 mm)	2 7/8 inches (73 mm)	3 1/16 inches (78 mm)	3 1/4 inches (83 mm)	3 7/16 inches (87 mm)	3 5/8 inches (92 mm)	3 13/16 inches (97 mm)	4 inches (102 mm)	4 3/16 inches (106 mm)	4 3/8 inches (111 mm)	4 9/16 inches (116 mm)
10 1/3 inches (262 mm)	7 17/50 inches (186 mm)	2 3/4 inches (70 mm)	2 15/16 inches (75 mm)	3 1/8 inches (79 mm)	3 5/16 inches (84 mm)	3 1/2 inches (89 mm)	3 11/16 inches (94 mm)	3 7/8 inches (98 mm)	4 1/16 inches (103 mm)	4 1/4 inches (108 mm)	4 7/16 inches (113 mm)	4 5/8 inches (117 mm)
10 1/2 inches (267 mm)	7 9/20 inches (189 mm)	2 13/16 inches (71 mm)	3 inches (76 mm)	3 3/16 inches (81 mm)	3 3/8 inches (86 mm)	3 9/16 inches (90 mm)	3 3/4 inches (95 mm)	3 15/16 inches (100 mm)	4 1/8 inches (105 mm)	4 5/16 inches (110 mm)	4 1/2 inches (114 mm)	4 11/16 inches (119 mm)
10 2/3 inches (271 mm)	7 14/25 inches (192 mm)	2 7/8 inches (73 mm)	3 1/16 inches (78 mm)	3 1/4 inches (83 mm)	3 7/16 inches (87 mm)	3 5/8 inches (92 mm)	3 13/16 inches (97 mm)	4 inches (102 mm)	4 3/16 inches (106 mm)	4 3/8 inches (111 mm)	4 9/16 inches (116 mm)	4 3/4 inches (121 mm)
10 5/6 inches (275 mm)	7 67/100 inches (195 mm)	2 15/16 inches (75 mm)	3 1/8 inches (79 mm)	3 5/16 inches (84 mm)	3 1/2 inches (89 mm)	3 11/16 inches (94 mm)	3 7/8 inches (98 mm)	4 1/16 inches (103 mm)	4 1/4 inches (108 mm)	4 7/16 inches (113 mm)	4 5/8 inches (117 mm)	4 13/16 inches (122 mm)
11 inches (279 mm)	7 39/50 inches (198 mm)	3 inches (76 mm)	3 3/16 inches (81 mm)	3 3/8 inches (86 mm)	3 9/16 inches (90 mm)	3 3/4 inches (95 mm)	3 15/16 inches (100 mm)	4 1/8 inches (105 mm)	4 5/16 inches (110 mm)	4 1/2 inches (114 mm)	4 11/16 inches (119 mm)	4 7/8 inches (124 mm)
11 1/6 inches (284 mm)	7 89/100 inches (200 mm)	3 1/16 inches (78 mm)	3 1/4 inches (83 mm)	3 7/16 inches (87 mm)	3 5/8 inches (92 mm)	3 13/16 inches (97 mm)	4 inches (102 mm)	4 3/16 inches (106 mm)	4 3/8 inches (111 mm)	4 9/16 inches (116 mm)	4 3/4 inches (121 mm)	4 15/16 inches (125 mm)
11 1/3 inches (288 mm)	8 inches (203 mm)	3 1/8 inches (79 mm)	3 5/16 inches (84 mm)	3 1/2 inches (89 mm)	3 11/16 inches (94 mm)	3 7/8 inches (98 mm)	4 1/16 inches (103 mm)	4 1/4 inches (108 mm)	4 7/16 inches (113 mm)	4 5/8 inches (117 mm)	4 13/16 inches (122 mm)	5 inches (127 mm)
11 1/2 inches (292 mm)	8 11/100 inches (206 mm)	3 3/16 inches (81 mm)	3 3/8 inches (86 mm)	3 9/16 inches (90 mm)	3 3/4 inches (95 mm)	3 15/16 inches (100 mm)	4 1/8 inches (105 mm)	4 5/16 inches (110 mm)	4 1/2 inches (114 mm)	4 11/16 inches (119 mm)	4 7/8 inches (124 mm)	5 1/16 inches (129 mm)
11 2/3 inches (296 mm)	8 11/50 inches (209 mm)	3 1/4 inches (83 mm)	3 7/16 inches (87 mm)	3 5/8 inches (92 mm)	3 13/16 inches (97 mm)	4 inches (102 mm)	4 3/16 inches (106 mm)	4 3/8 inches (111 mm)	4 9/16 inches (116 mm)	4 3/4 inches (121 mm)	4 15/16 inches (125 mm)	5 1/8 inches (130 mm)
11 5/6 inches (301 mm)	8 33/100 inches (212 mm)	3 5/16 inches (84 mm)	3 1/2 inches (89 mm)	3 11/16 inches (94 mm)	3 7/8 inches (98 mm)	4 1/16 inches (103 mm)	4 1/4 inches (108 mm)	4 7/16 inches (113 mm)	4 5/8 inches (117 mm)	4 13/16 inches (122 mm)	5 inches (127 mm)	5 3/16 inches (132 mm)
12 inches (305 mm)	8 11/25 inches (214 mm)	3 3/8 inches (86 mm)	3 9/16 inches (90 mm)	3 3/4 inches (95 mm)	3 15/16 inches (100 mm)	4 1/8 inches (105 mm)	4 5/16 inches (110 mm)	4 1/2 inches (114 mm)	4 11/16 inches (119 mm)	4 7/8 inches (124 mm)	5 1/16 inches (129 mm)	5 1/4 inches (133 mm)
12 1/6 inches (309 mm)	8 11/20 inches (217 mm)	3 7/16 inches (87 mm)	3 5/8 inches (92 mm)	3 13/16 inches (97 mm)	4 inches (102 mm)	4 3/16 inches (106 mm)	4 3/8 inches (111 mm)	4 9/16 inches (116 mm)	4 3/4 inches (121 mm)	4 15/16 inches (125 mm)	5 1/8 inches (130 mm)	5 5/16 inches (135 mm)
12 1/3 inches (313 mm)	8 33/50 inches (220 mm)	3 1/2 inches (89 mm)	3 11/16 inches (94 mm)	3 7/8 inches (98 mm)	4 1/16 inches (103 mm)	4 1/4 inches (108 mm)	4 7/16 inches (113 mm)	4 5/8 inches (117 mm)	4 13/16 inches (122 mm)	5 inches (127 mm)	5 3/16 inches (132 mm)	5 3/8 inches (137 mm)
12 1/2 inches (318 mm)	8 77/100 inches (223 mm)	3 9/16 inches (90 mm)	3 3/4 inches (95 mm)	3 15/16 inches (100 mm)	4 1/8 inches (105 mm)	4 5/16 inches (110 mm)	4 1/2 inches (114 mm)	4 11/16 inches (119 mm)	4 7/8 inches (124 mm)	5 1/16 inches (129 mm)	5 1/4 inches (133 mm)	5 7/16 inches (138 mm)
12 2/3 inches (322 mm)	8 22/25 inches (226 mm)	3 5/8 inches (92 mm)	3 13/16 inches (97 mm)	4 inches (102 mm)	4 3/16 inches (106 mm)	4 3/8 inches (111 mm)	4 9/16 inches (116 mm)	4 3/4 inches (121 mm)	4 15/16 inches (125 mm)	5 1/8 inches (130 mm)	5 5/16 inches (135 mm)	5 1/2 inches (140 mm)
12 5/6 inches (326 mm)	8 99/100 inches (228 mm)	3 11/16 inches (94 mm)	3 7/8 inches (98 mm)	4 1/16 inches (103 mm)	4 1/4 inches (108 mm)	4 7/16 inches (113 mm)	4 5/8 inches (117 mm)	4 13/16 inches (122 mm)	5 inches (127 mm)	5 3/16 inches (132 mm)	5 3/8 inches (137 mm)	5 9/16 inches (141 mm)
13 inches (330 mm)	9 1/10 inches (231 mm)	3 3/4 inches (95 mm)	3 15/16 inches (100 mm)	4 1/8 inches (105 mm)	4 5/16 inches (110 mm)	4 1/2 inches (114 mm)	4 11/16 inches (119 mm)	4 7/8 inches (124 mm)	5 1/16 inches (129 mm)	5 1/4 inches (133 mm)	5 7/16 inches (138 mm)	5 5/8 inches (143 mm)
13 1/6 inches (334 mm)	9 21/100 inches (234 mm)	3 13/16 inches (97 mm)	4 inches (102 mm)	4 3/16 inches (106 mm)	4 3/8 inches (111 mm)	4 9/16 inches (116 mm)	4 3/4 inches (121 mm)	4 15/16 inches (125 mm)	5 1/8 inches (130 mm)	5 5/16 inches (135 mm)	5 1/2 inches (140 mm)	5 11/16 inches (144 mm)
13 1/3 inches (339 mm)	9 8/25 inches (237 mm)	3 7/8 inches (98 mm)	4 1/16 inches (103 mm)	4 1/4 inches (108 mm)	4 7/16 inches (113 mm)	4 5/8 inches (117 mm)	4 13/16 inches (122 mm)	5 inches (127 mm)	5 3/16 inches (132 mm)	5 3/8 inches (137 mm)	5 9/16 inches (141 mm)	5 3/4 inches (146 mm)
13 1/2 inches (343 mm)	9 43/100 inches (240 mm)	3 15/16 inches (100 mm)	4 1/8 inches (105 mm)	4 5/16 inches (110 mm)	4 1/2 inches (114 mm)	4 11/16 inches (119 mm)	4 7/8 inches (124 mm)	5 1/16 inches (129 mm)	5 1/4 inches (133 mm)	5 7/16 inches (138 mm)	5 5/8 inches (143 mm)	5 13/16 inches (148 mm)
13 2/3 inches (347 mm)	9 27/50 inches (242 mm)	4 inches (102 mm)	4 3/16 inches (106 mm)	4 3/8 inches (111 mm)	4 9/16 inches (116 mm)	4 3/4 inches (121 mm)	4 15/16 inches (125 mm)	5 1/8 inches (130 mm)	5 5/16 inches (135 mm)	5 1/2 inches (140 mm)	5 11/16 inches (144 mm)	5 7/8 inches (149 mm)
13 5/6 inches (351 mm)	9 13/20 inches (245 mm)	4 1/16 inches (103 mm)	4 1/4 inches (108 mm)	4 7/16 inches (113 mm)	4 5/8 inches (117 mm)	4 13/16 inches (122 mm)	5 inches (127 mm)	5 3/16 inches (132 mm)	5 3/8 inches (137 mm)	5 9/16 inches (141 mm)	5 3/4 inches (146 mm)	5 15/16 inches (151 mm)
14 inches (356 mm)	9 19/25 inches (248 mm)	4 1/8 inches (105 mm)	4 5/16 inches (110 mm)	4 1/2 inches (114 mm)	4 11/16 inches (119 mm)	4 7/8 inches (124 mm)	5 1/16 inches (129 mm)	5 1/4 inches (133 mm)	5 7/16 inches (138 mm)	5 5/8 inches (143 mm)	5 13/16 inches (148 mm)	6 inches (152 mm)
14 1/6 inches (360 mm)	9 87/100 inches (251 mm)	4 3/16 inches (106 mm)	4 3/8 inches (111 mm)	4 9/16 inches (116 mm)	4 3/4 inches (121 mm)	4 15/16 inches (125 mm)	5 1/8 inches (130 mm)	5 5/16 inches (135 mm)	5 1/2 inches (140 mm)	5 11/16 inches (144 mm)	5 7/8 inches (149 mm)	6 1/16 inches (154 mm)
14 1/3 inches (364 mm)	9 49/50 inches (253 mm)	4 1/4 inches (108 mm)	4 7/16 inches (113 mm)	4 5/8 inches (117 mm)	4 13/16 inches (122 mm)	5 inches (127 mm)	5 3/16 inches (132 mm)	5 3/8 inches (137 mm)	5 9/16 inches (141 mm)	5 3/4 inches (146 mm)	5 15/16 inches (151 mm)	6 1/8 inches (156 mm)
14 1/2 inches (368 mm)	10 9/100 inches (256 mm)	4 5/16 inches (110 mm)	4 1/2 inches (114 mm)	4 11/16 inches (119 mm)	4 7/8 inches (124 mm)	5 1/16 inches (129 mm)	5 1/4 inches (133 mm)	5 7/16 inches (138 mm)	5 5/8 inches (143 mm)	5 13/16 inches (148 mm)	6 inches (152 mm)	6 3/16 inches (157 mm)
14 2/3 inches (373 mm)	10 1/5 inches (259 mm)	4 3/8 inches (111 mm)	4 9/16 inches (116 mm)	4 3/4 inches (121 mm)	4 15/16 inches (125 mm)	5 1/8 inches (130 mm)	5 5/16 inches (135 mm)	5 1/2 inches (140 mm)	5 11/16 inches (144 mm)	5 7/8 inches (149 mm)	6 1/16 inches (154 mm)	6 1/4 inches (159 mm)
14 5/6 inches (377 mm)	10 31/100 inches (262 mm)	4 7/16 inches (113 mm)	4 5/8 inches (117 mm)	4 13/16 inches (122 mm)	5 inches (127 mm)	5 3/16 inches (132 mm)	5 3/8 inches (137 mm)	5 9/16 inches (141 mm)	5 3/4 inches (146 mm)	5 15/16 inches (151 mm)	6 1/8 inches (156 mm)	6 5/16 inches (160 mm)
15 inches (381 mm)	10 21/50 inches (265 mm)	4 1/2 inches (114 mm)	4 11/16 inches (119 mm)	4 7/8 inches (124 mm)	5 1/16 inches (129 mm)	5 1/4 inches (133 mm)	5 7/16 inches (138 mm)	5 5/8 inches (143 mm)	5 13/16 inches (148 mm)	6 inches (152 mm)	6 3/16 inches (157 mm)	6 3/8 inches (162 mm)
15 1/6 inches (385 mm)	10 53/100 inches (267 mm)	4 9/16 inches (116 mm)	4 3/4 inches (121 mm)	4 15/16 inches (125 mm)	5 1/8 inches (130 mm)	5 5/16 inches (135 mm)	5 1/2 inches (140 mm)	5 11/16 inches (144 mm)	5 7/8 inches (149 mm)	6 1/16 inches (154 mm)	6 1/4 inches (159 mm)	6 7/16 inches (164 mm)
15 1/3 inches (389 mm)	10 16/25 inches (270 mm)	4 5/8 inches (117 mm)	4 13/16 inches (122 mm)	5 inches (127 mm)	5 3/16 inches (132 mm)	5 3/8 inches (137 mm)	5 9/16 inches (141 mm)	5 3/4 inches (146 mm)	5 15/16 inches (151 mm)	6 1/8 inches (156 mm)	6 5/16 inches (160 mm)	6 1/2 inches (165 mm)
15 1/2 inches (394 mm)	10 3/4 inches (273 mm)	4 11/16 inches (119 mm)	4 7/8 inches (124 mm)	5 1/16 inches (129 mm)	5 1/4 inches (133 mm)	5 7/16 inches (138 mm)	5 5/8 inches (143 mm)	5 13/16 inches (148 mm)	6 inches (152 mm)	6 3/16 inches (157 mm)	6 3/8 inches (162 mm)	6 9/16 inches (167 mm)
15 2/3 inches (398 mm)	10 43/50 inches (276 mm)	4 3/4 inches (121 mm)	4 15/16 inches (125 mm)	5 1/8 inches (130 mm)	5 5/16 inches (135 mm)	5 1/2 inches (140 mm)	5 11/16 inches (144 mm)	5 7/8 inches (149 mm)	6 1/16 inches (154 mm)	6 1/4 inches (159 mm)	6 7/16 inches (164 mm)	6 5/8 inches (168 mm)
15 5/6 inches (402 mm)	10 97/100 inches (279 mm)	4 13/16 inches (122 mm)	5 inches (127 mm)	5 3/16 inches (132 mm)	5 3/8 inches (137 mm)	5 9/16 inches (141 mm)	5 3/4 inches (146 mm)	5 15/16 inches (151 mm)	6 1/8 inches (156 mm)	6 5/16 inches (160 mm)	6 1/2 inches (165 mm)	6 11/16 inches (170 mm)

== Bibliography ==
- Craig, Berry (Summer 2000). "Why the Shoe Fits". American Heritage of Invention & Technology. 16 (1): 64.
- Davidson, Martha (Fall 2001). "A Fitting Place for the Brannock Device Company Records". The Lemelson Center (The Smithsonian Institution). Archived from the original on 2005-08-18.
- Lukas, Paul (1997). Inconspicuous Consumption: An Obsessive Look at the Stuff We Take for Granted, from the Everyday to the Obscure. Three Rivers Press. ISBN 0-517-88668-5.
- "Brannock Device Company Records, 1925–1998". Archived from the original on 2005-10-01.
- Aeppel, Timothy (2011-01-10). "Maker of Foot Measurer Tries to Stop Other Shoe From Dropping - On It". Wall Street Journal.
