= Brannoch =

Brannoch may refer to:

- Brannoch Castle and Brannoch Castle Town, locations in the game Quest 64
- Brannoch the Black, a Daemonite in the Wildstorm comic books
- Brannoch, a brand owned by Hartmarx

== See also ==
- Brannock (disambiguation)
