= Barleycorn (unit) =

Historic unit of length, basis of shoe sizes

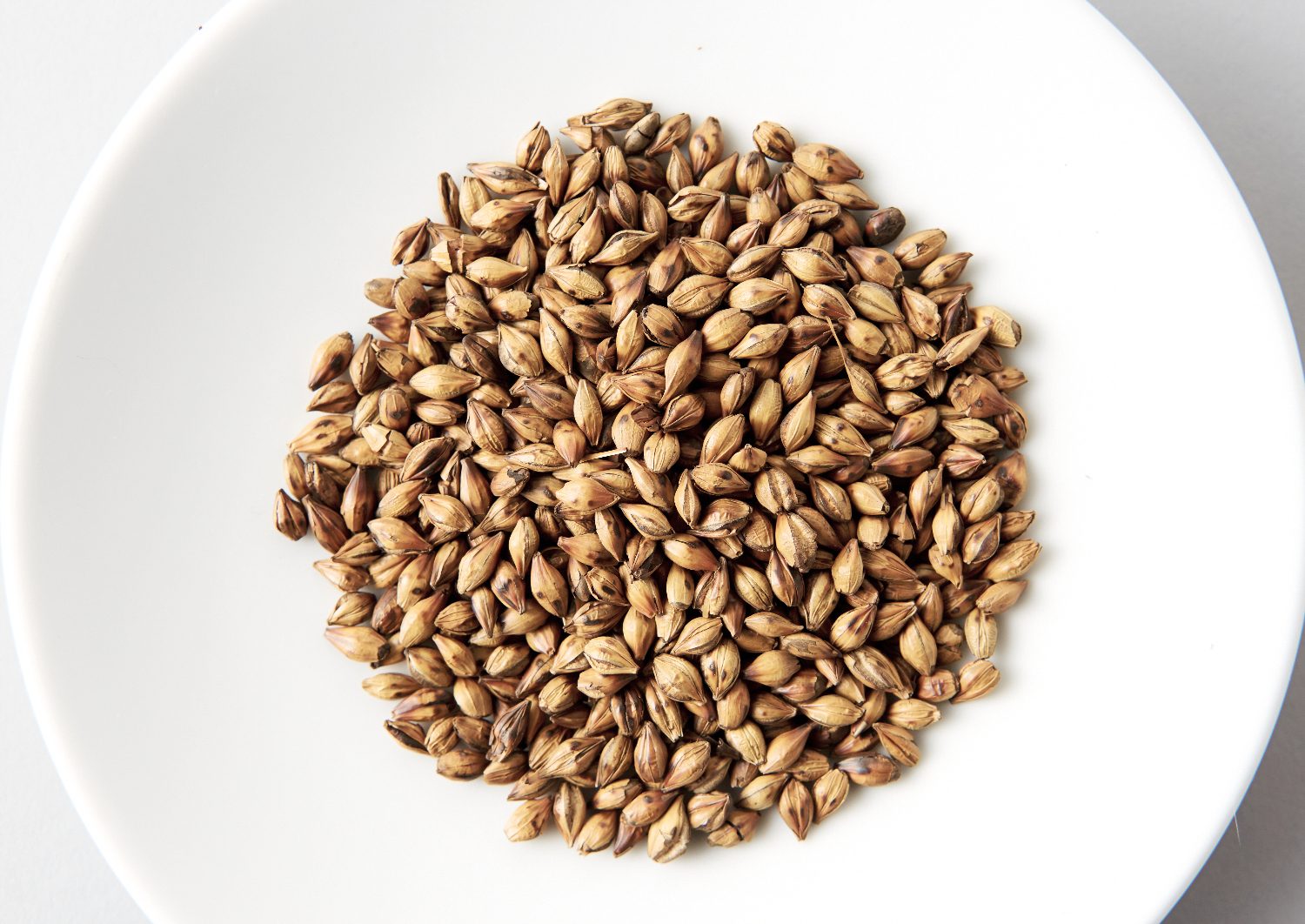
- The barleycorn is based on the length of a barley grain.

General information
- Unit system: Imperial units
- Unit of: Length

Conversions
| 1 barleycorn in ... | ... is equal to ... |
- Imperial units: 1/3 in
- SI units: 8.46̅ mm

A chart of Imperial and United States customary units.

The barleycorn is an English unit of length equal to 1/3 of an inch (i.e. about 8.47 mm; 333.33 thou). It is still used as the basis of shoe sizes in some English-speaking countries.

== History ==
Under the 1300 Composition of Yards and Perches, one of the statutes of uncertain date that was notionally in force until the 1824 Weights and Measures Act, "3 barly cornes dry and rounde" were to serve as the basis for the inch and thence the larger units of feet, yards, perches and thus of the acre, an important unit of area. The notion of three barleycorns composing an inch certainly predates this statute, however, appearing in the 10th-century Welsh Laws of Hywel Dda.

In practice, various weights and measures acts of the English kings were standardized with reference to some particular yard-length iron, brass, or bronze bar held by the king or the Royal Exchequer. The formal barleycorn was 1/108 of its length.

As modern studies show, the actual length of a kernel of barley varies from as short as 0.16–0.28 in (4–7 mm) to as long as 0.47–0.59 in (12–15 mm) depending on the cultivar. Older sources claimed the average length of a grain of barley was 0.345 in (8.8 mm), while that of a grain of "bigg" was 0.3245 in (8.24 mm).

== See also ==
- Line, 1/4 of a barleycorn or 1/12 of an inch
- List of unusual units of measurement
- Poppyseed, 1/4 or 1/5 of a barleycorn
