= Charles F. Brannock =

American inventor

- Born: May 16, 1903
- Died: November 22, 1992 (aged 89)
- Education: Syracuse University
- Known for: Brannock Device
- Awards: National Inventors Hall of Fame, inducted 2007
- Scientific career
- Fields: Inventor

Charles F. Brannock (May 16, 1903 – November 22, 1992) was the inventor and manufacturer of the Brannock Device for measuring overall length, width, and heel-to-ball length of the foot.

== Biography ==
The son of a shoe industry entrepreneur, Brannock attended Syracuse University, New York, where he was a member of Delta Kappa Epsilon fraternity. He was proprietor of the Park-Brannock Shoe Store in Syracuse, New York and spent two years developing a simple means of measuring the length, width, and arch length of the human foot. He eventually improved on the wooden RITZ Stick, the industry standard of the day, patenting his first prototype in 1925 and an improved version in 1927. The instrument was a sales aid, but by ensuring more accurate fittings, the device also helped his customers alleviate or avoid foot problems due to ill-fitting shoes. Though there were competing measuring devices on the market, the Brannock Device quickly became the industry standard and is still used in shoe stores all over the world. Brannock later formed the Brannock Device Company to manufacture and sell the product. Brannock also developed specially calibrated devices for the various branches of the military, which issued millions of boots and shoes to servicemen, especially during World War II. Brannock headed the company until 1992 when he died at age 89.

== Patents ==
- Charles F. Brannock, "Foot-Measuring Instrument," U.S. Patent 1,682,366
