= Toddler =

Phase of human growth between 1 and 3 years old

A toddler is a child approximately 1 to 3 years old, though definitions vary. The toddler years are a time of great cognitive, emotional and social development. The word is derived from "toddle", which means to walk unsteadily, as children at this age do.

By the age of two, toddlers typically reach several important milestones, including walking, running, climbing and speaking in short phrases. Their vocabulary expands rapidly and they begin to show increased independence as they explore their environment and make known their preferences.

== Developmental milestones ==
Normal vital parameters of toddlers
Blood Pressure (mmHg)	Systolic	80–110
Blood Pressure (mmHg)	Diastolic	50–80
Heart rate (BPM)		90–140
Respiratory rate		20–40

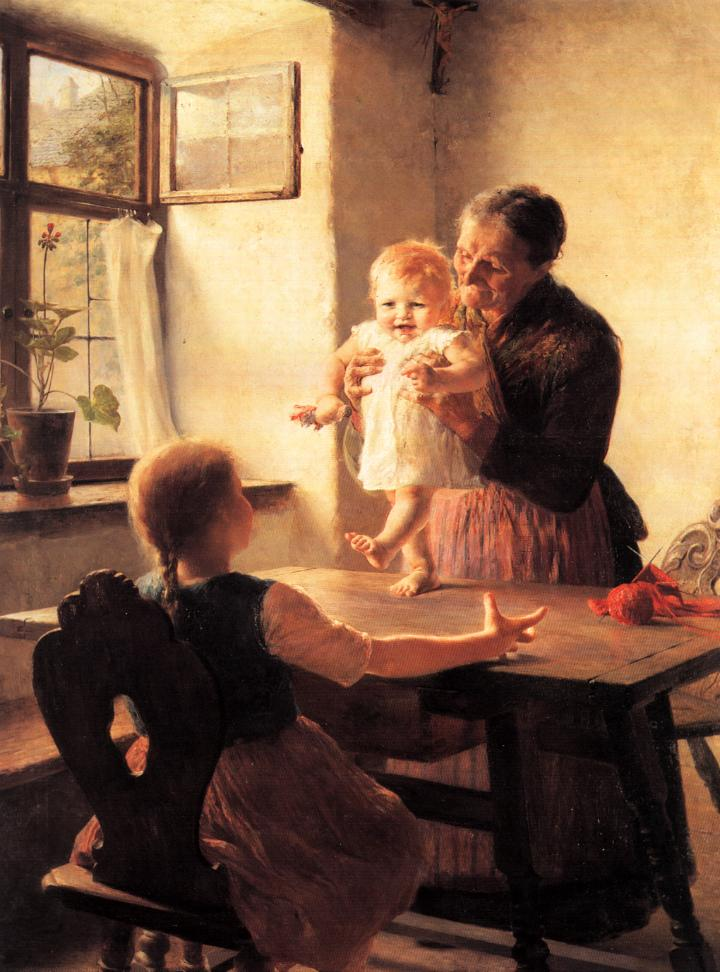
Painting from 1892 of an infant learning to walk. Taking their first independent steps, typically in the months after their first birthday, is often seen as one of the major milestones in the early years of a child's life.

Toddler development can be broken down into a number of interrelated areas. There is reasonable consensus about what these areas may include:

- Physical: growth or an increase in size.
- Gross motor: the control of large muscles which enable walking, running, jumping and climbing.
- Fine motor: the ability to control small muscles; enabling the toddler to feed themselves, draw and manipulate objects.
- Vision: the ability to see near and far and interpret what is seen.
- Hearing and speech: the ability to hear and receive information and listen (interpret), and the ability to understand and learn language and use it to communicate effectively.
- Social: the ability to interact with the world through playing with others, taking turns and fantasy play.

Although it is useful to chart defined periods of development, development exists on a continuum, with considerable differences between individual children. There is a wide range of what may be considered 'normal' development. However, according to experts, there are specific milestones that should be achieved by certain ages and stages in life in order to properly grow and develop. Medical experts also point out that children develop in their own time and suggest that carers should not worry too much if a child fails to reach all the milestones for their age range. Premature birth or illness during infancy may also slow down a young child's development.

Below follows a rough breakdown of the kinds of skills and attributes which young children can be expected to have developed by different points during the toddler period.

Aspects	Physical and motor	Intellectual and Social
One year old	Triple the birth weight; Grow to a height of 50% over the birth length; Have a head circumference equal to that of the chest; Have one to eight teeth; Pull to stand; Walk with help or alone; Sit down without help; Bang two blocks together; Turn through the pages of a book by flipping many pages at a time; Have a pincer grasp; Sleep 8–10 hours a night and take one to two naps	Follows a fast moving object; Can respond to sounds; Responds to their name; Understands several words; Can say mama, papa, and at least one or two other words; Understands simple commands; Tries to imitate animal sounds; Connects names with objects; Understands that objects continue to exist, even when they are not seen (object permanence); Points to objects with index finger; Waves bye bye; May develop an attachment to a toy or object; Experiences separation anxiety and may cling to parents; May make brief journeys away from parents to explore in familiar settings
Months after first birthday	Walks well alone with wide based gait; Creeps upstairs; Builds with blocks; Drinks from a cup, uses a spoon; Enjoys throwing objects and picking them up	Can use 10-15 words; Says "no" (see holophrasis); Indicates when diaper is wet
18 months old	Walks sideways and backwards, runs well, falls easily; Climbs stairs or up on furniture; Scribbles vigorously, attempting a straight line; Drinks well from a cup, still spills with a spoon	Uses phrases composed of adjectives and nouns; Begins to have temper tantrums; Very ritualistic, has favorite toy or blanket; Thumb sucking may be at peak
Two years old	Weight: about 11–13 kilograms (24–29 lb); Height: about 80–82 centimetres (31–32 in); Teeth: 12 temporary; Gross motor skills are quite well refined, can walk up and down stairs on both feet with one step at a time while holding on to a rail; Builds tower of five cubes; Control of spoon well-developed; Toilet trained during day time	Vocabulary of about 350 words; Obeys simple commands; Helps undress self and put on simple clothes; Shows sign of increased autonomy and individuality; Does not share possessions
Two and a half years old	Teeth: full set of 20 temporary; Decreased need for naps	Begins to see self as separate individual; may still see other children as "objects"

=== Early milestones and intelligence ===
It has long been known that markedly late achievement of developmental milestones is related to intellectual or physical disabilities. However, it was thought for a long time that within the general population no relationship between the age of passing developmental milestones and later intelligence is seen. It was only more recently discovered that early passing of developmental milestones indicates in general a higher level of intelligence. A study from 2007 based on more than 5,000 children born in the United Kingdom in 1946 showed that for every month earlier a child learned to stand, there was a gain of one half of one intelligence quotient point at age 8. Also a later 2018 study found a relationship between milestone achievement and intelligence in adulthood (in this case, the milestone used was being able to name objects/animals in pictures at less than 18 months, 18–24 months, and later than 24 months). The IQ of children who were able to form a sentence at less than 24 months of age averaged 107 points, whereas children who were able to form a sentence later than 24 months of age in young adulthood (20–34 years old) had an average IQ of 101. Early passing developmental milestones and the head circumference up to the age of 3 years explained about 6% of variance in IQ in adulthood. In comparison, parental socioeconomic status and the child's sex explained about 23% of the variance in IQ. However, experts advise against rushing children through milestones, as long as they are reaching them within a normal range.

== Toilet training ==
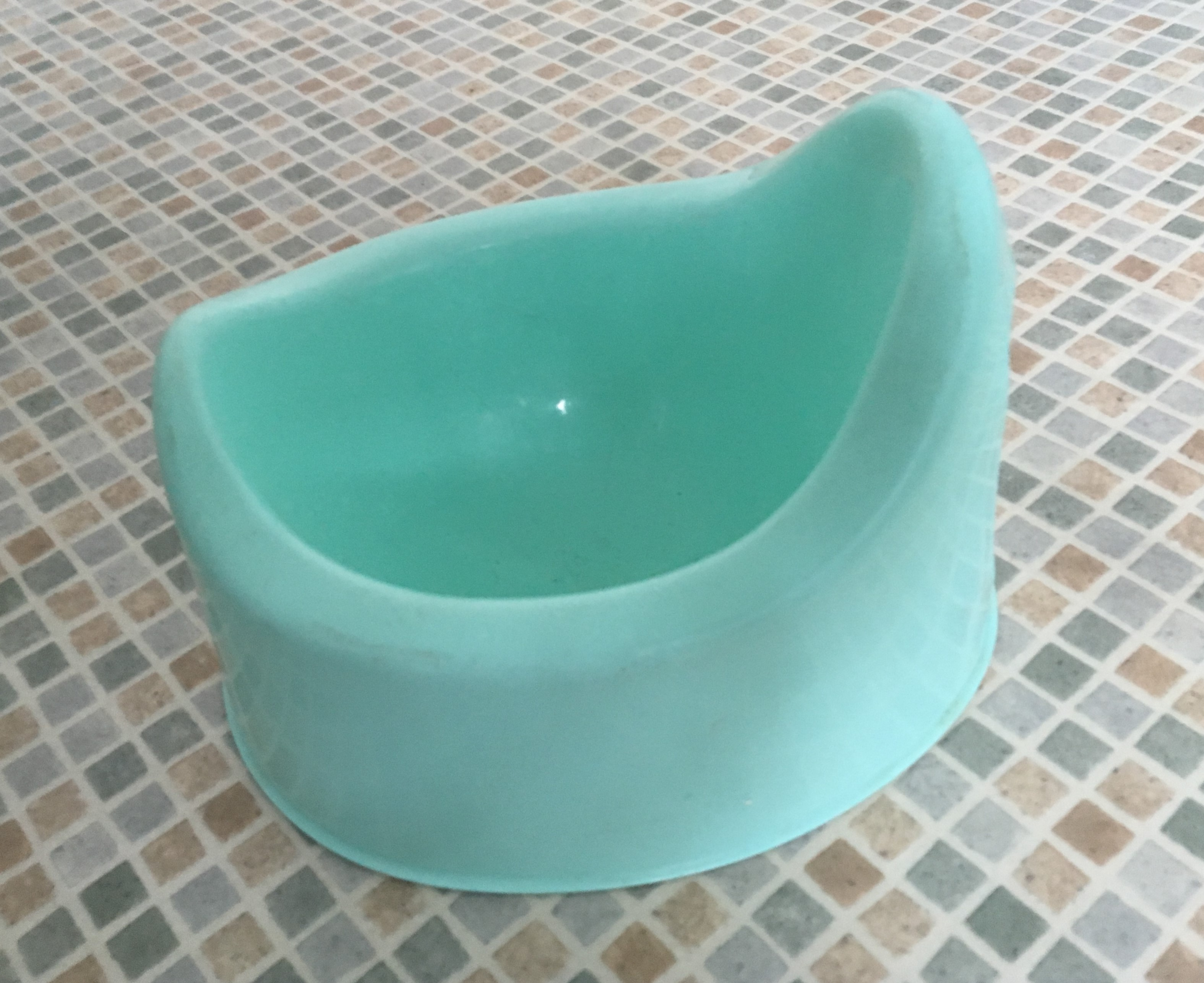
A simply designed potty, a place for young children who are first learning how to use the toilet to relieve themselves.

== Squatting ==
Young children instinctively squat as a fluid movement from standing whenever they want to lower themselves to ground level. One- and two-year-olds are often seen playing in a stable squatting position, with their feet wide apart and their bottoms not quite touching the floor. Initially, they need to hold onto something to stand up again.

== Language ==
Talking is the next milestone of which parents are typically aware. A toddler's first word often occurs around 12 months, but this is only an average. The child will then continue to steadily add to their vocabulary until around the age of 18 months when language increases rapidly. They may learn as many as 7–9 new words a day. Around this time, toddlers generally know about 50 words. At 21 months is when toddlers begin to incorporate two word phrases into their vocabulary, such as "I go", "mama give", and "baby play". Before going to sleep they often engage in a monologue called crib talk in which they practice conversational skills. At this age, children are becoming very proficient at conveying their wants and needs to their parents in a verbal fashion.

== Emotions and self-image ==
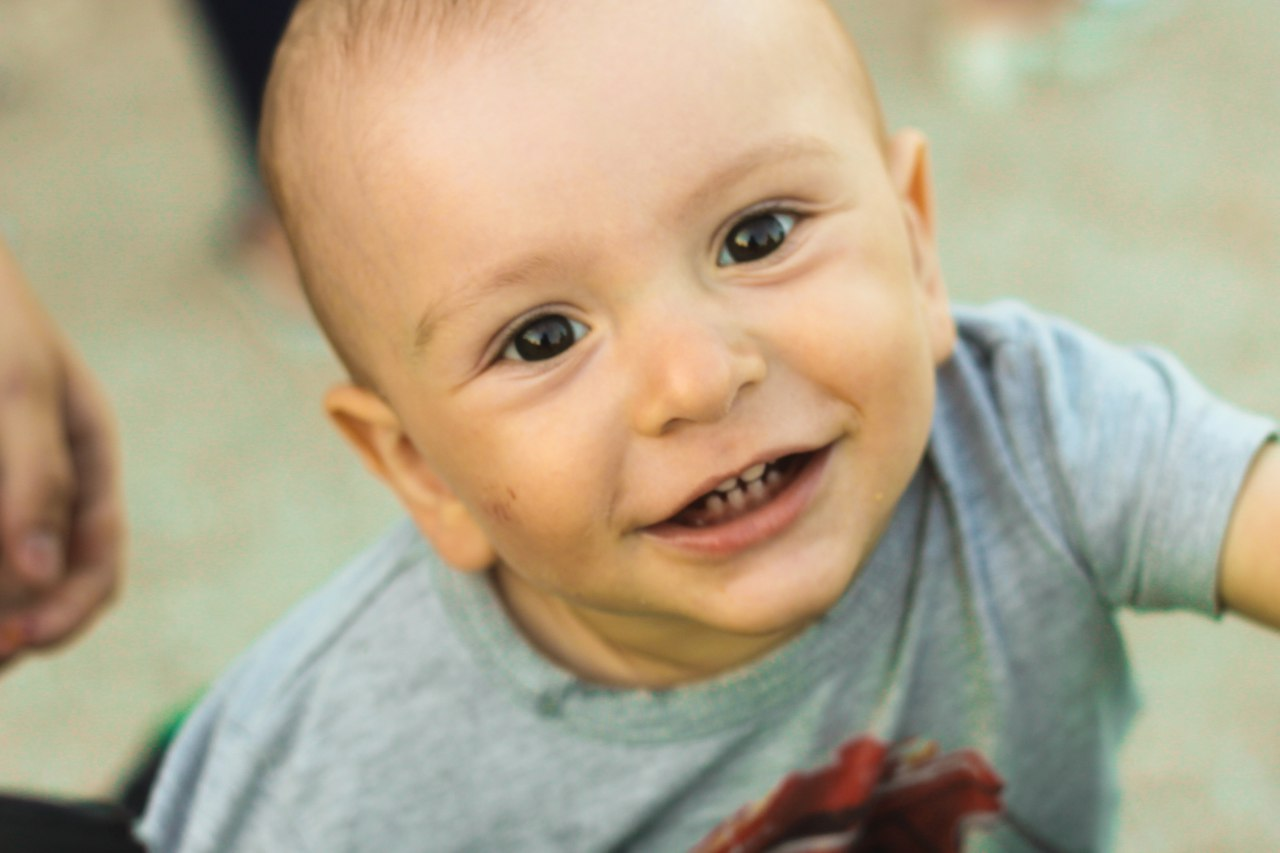
Children can express positive emotions through smiles and laughter from early on in infancy.

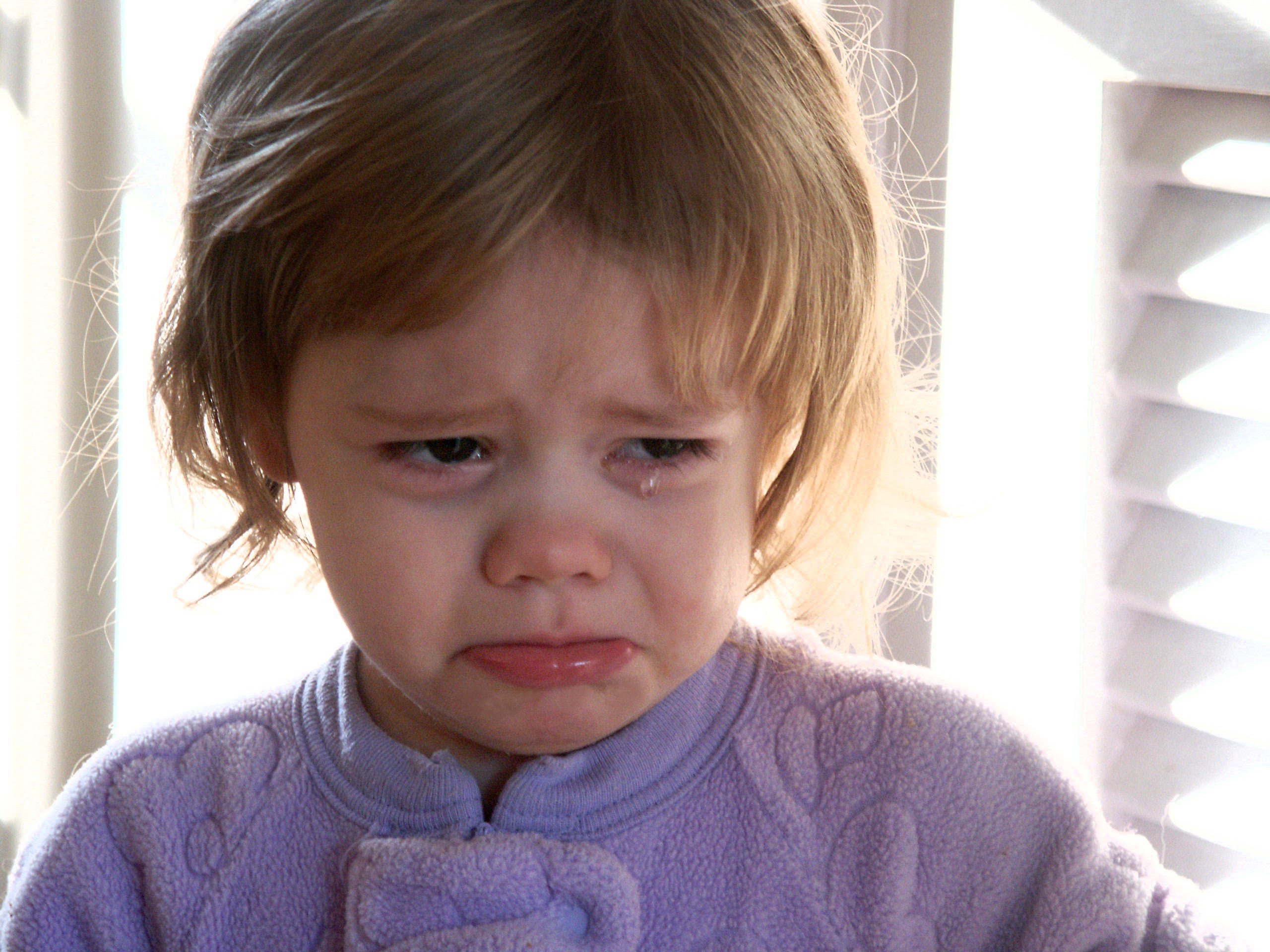
Before and in the early stages of developing verbal communication, children often struggle to communicate negative emotions in ways other than tearfulness.

There are several other important milestones that are achieved in this time period that parents tend not to emphasize as much as walking and talking. Gaining the ability to point at whatever it is the child wants someone to see shows huge psychological gains in a toddler. This generally happens before a child's first birthday.

This age is sometimes referred to as "the terrible twos", because of the temper tantrums for which they are famous. This stage can begin as early as nine months old depending on the child and environment. Toddlers tend to have temper tantrums because they have such strong emotions but do not know how to express themselves the way that older children and adults do. Immediate causes can include physical factors such as hunger, discomfort and fatigue or a child's desire to gain greater independence and control of the environment around them. The toddler is discovering that they are a separate being from their parent and are testing their boundaries in learning the way the world around them works. Although the toddler is in their exploratory phase, it is also important to understand that the methods used by the parents for communicating with the toddler can either set off a tantrum or calm the situation. Research has shown that parents with histories of maltreatment, violence exposure, and related psychopathology may have particular difficulty in responding sensitively and in a developmentally appropriate manner to their toddlers' tantrums and thus may benefit from parent-child mental health consultation. This time between the ages of two and five when they are reaching for independence repeats itself during adolescence.

Self-awareness is another milestone that helps parents understand how a toddler is reacting. Around 18 months of age, a child will begin to recognize themself as a separate physical being with their own thoughts and actions. A parent can test if this milestone has been reached by noticing if the toddler recognizes that their reflection in a mirror is in fact themselves. One way to test this is the rouge test: putting lipstick on the child's face and showing them their own reflection. Upon seeing the out-of-the-ordinary mark, if the child reaches to their own face, the child has achieved this important milestone. Along with self recognition comes feelings of embarrassment and pride that the child had not previously experienced.

== See also ==
- Child development stages
- Early childhood
- Early childhood education
- Sign language in infants and toddlers
- Toddler shoes, shoes for children aged 1 to 3 years

Preceded by Infancy	Stages of human development Toddlerhood	Succeeded by Childhood
