= Victor Krylov =

Russian-born British academic

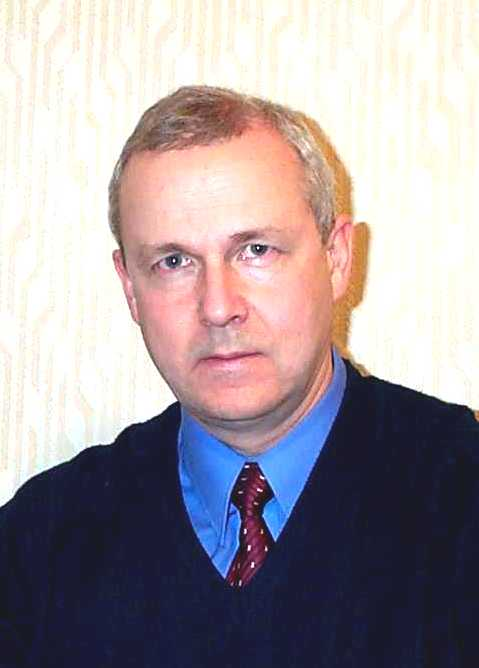
- Born: 1952 (age 73–74); Tambov, Russia
- Education: Moscow State University
- Known for: Ground vibration boom Acoustic black hole effect
- Awards: Lenin Komsomol Prize (1984); Rayleigh Medal (2000)
- Scientific career
- Fields: Acoustics, Vibration
- Workplaces: Moscow State University, University of Edinburgh, Nottingham Trent University, Loughborough University

Victor Krylov (Russian: Виктор Владимирович Крылов) is a Russian-born British academic. He is emeritus professor of acoustics and vibration at Loughborough University.

== Biography ==
Krylov was born in Tambov, Russia, in 1952. He received his PhD in physics and mathematics (specialisation in acoustics) from the Moscow State University in 1981. In 1989 he received his DSc in the same disciplines from the Moscow State University and the Higher Attestation Commission of the former USSR. He joined the staff at the Moscow State University as research scientist in 1980 and later was promoted to senior research scientist. During this time he visited the University of Edinburgh in 1990-91 as an SERC visiting fellow. In 1993 Krylov moved to the Nottingham Trent University as professor of acoustics, and in 2001 he joined Loughborough University as professor of acoustics and vibration. In 2020 he became an emeritus professor at Loughborough University.

Krylov has been awarded the Lenin Komsomol Prize in 1984 and the Rayleigh Medal in 2000.

== Work ==
Krylov carried out research into Rayleigh waves, including their propagation at hypersonic frequencies, their propagation and scattering on curved and statistically rough surfaces. Further topics include acoustic emission from cracks developing in brittle solids, laser generation of sound in solids, localised vibrations propagating along edges of elastic wedges.

From 1993 Krylov worked in the UK, conducting research on ground vibrations generated by railway trains and by road vehicles. His prediction of ground vibration boom from high-speed trains travelling at speeds larger than Rayleigh wave velocity in the supporting ground has received public attention in connection with the proposed High Speed Rail system HS2 in the UK.

Krylov predicted the existence of localised elastic waves in immersed solid wedges and proposed to use them for wave-like aquatic propulsion of marine vessels. He suggests using electric motors or shape-memory materials to emulate the propulsion of some fish, such as stingrays, a process less efficient but quieter than conventional propellers. He also investigated the method of damping structural vibrations based on the "acoustic black hole effect" for flexural waves propagating in plates of variable local thickness.

Krylov has published several books and numerous papers on topics related to acoustics and vibration.

== Books ==
- Krasil'nikov, V.A. and Krylov, V.V. (1984), Introduction to Physical Acoustics, Nauka, Moscow (in Russian).
- Krasil'nikov, V.A. and Krylov, V.V. (1985), Surface Acoustic Waves, Znanie, Moscow (in Russian).
- Krylov, V.V. (1989), Basic Principles of Sound Radiation and Scattering, Moscow University Press, Moscow (in Russian).
- Biryukov, S.V., Gulyaev, Y.V., Krylov, V.V. and Plessky, V.P. (1995), Surface Acoustic Waves in Inhomogeneous Media, Springer-Verlag, Berlin.
- Krylov, V.V. (ed) (2001), Noise and Vibration from High Speed Trains, Thomas Telford, London.
- Krylov, V.V. (ed) (2019), Ground Vibrations from High-Speed Railways: Prediction and Mitigation, ICE Publishing, London.
