= Coolfluid =

Scientific computing environment

COOLFluiD
- Developer(s): von Karman Institute and others
- Stable release: 2014.9 / 23 09 2014
- Repository: github.com/andrealani/COOLFluiD
- Operating system: Unix/Linux/Windows/Mac OS X
- License: [LGPLv3]
- Website: COOLFluiD on GitHub

COOLFluiD is a component based scientific computing environment that handles high-performance computing problems with focus on complex computational fluid dynamics (CFD) involving multiphysics phenomena.

It features a Collaborative Simulation Environment where multiple physical models and multiple discretization methods are implemented as components within the environment. These components form a component-based architecture where they serve as building blocks of customized applications.

== Capabilities ==
Kernel

- Component based architecture
- Dynamic loading of external plugins
- Interpolation and integration on arbitrary elements
- Transparent MPI parallelization
- Parallel writing and reading from solution files
- Support for XML case files
- Unstructured 2D/3D hybrid meshes in many formats

Numerical Methods

- Cell Center finite volume solver
- Residual distribution solver
- High order finite element solver
- Spectral Finite Volume solver
- Spectral Finite Difference solver
- Discontinuous Galerkin method solver
- Residual Distribution solver (dedicated to incompressible flow)

Physical Models

- Compressible Euler and Navier-Stokes Equations
  - Perfect and Real Gas (from low Mach to hypersonic)
  - Chemical reacting mixtures
  - Thermal and Chemical non-equilibrium flows
- Incompressible Navier-Stokes
- Linearized Euler (for Aeroacoustics)
- Ideal Magnetohydrodynamics
- Structural Elasticity
- Multi-ion Electrochemistry
- Heat transfer
- Multiple Scalar Advection models
