= John Ffowcs Williams =

British engineer-scientist (1935–2020)

John Ffowcs Williams FRSA FRAeS FInstP FREng
- Born: Shôn Eirwen Ffowcs Williams; 25 May 1935; Wales
- Died: 12 December 2020 (aged 85); North Wales, Wales
- Spouse: Anne Mason (m. 1959)
- Awards: Sir Frank Whittle Medal (2002)

Academic background
- Education: Great Ayton Friends' School; Derby Technical College
- Alma mater: University of Southampton
- Thesis: On Noise from Convected Turbulence (1961)
- Doctoral advisor: Elfyn Richards

Academic work
- Discipline: Engineering
- Sub-discipline: Acoustics; Fluid mechanics
- Institutions: Imperial College, London; University of Cambridge; Emmanuel College, Cambridge
- Doctoral students: David Crighton; Ann Dowling; Steve Furber
- Main interests: Aeroacoustics; Fluid dynamics
- Notable ideas: Ffowcs Williams–Hawkings analogy

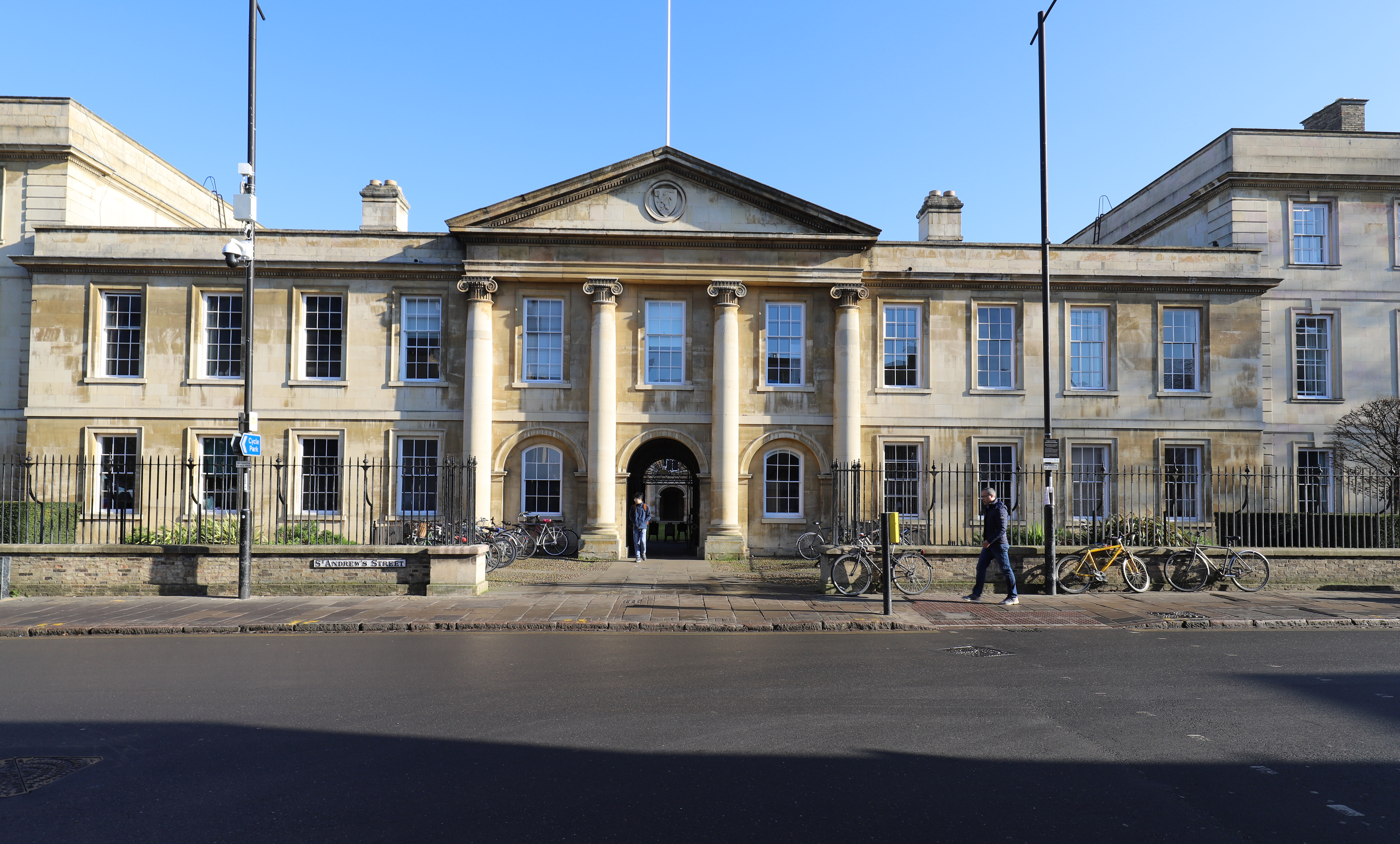
Emmanuel College, Cambridge

John "Shôn" Eirwyn Ffowcs Williams (Note: English pronunciation: /ˈʃɔːn ˈaɪərwɪn ˈfaʊks/ SHAWN IRE-win FOWKS; Welsh pronunciation: [ʃoːn ˈɛirʊɨn ˈfɔʊks].) (25 May 1935 – 12 December 2020) was Emeritus Rank Professor of Engineering at the University of Cambridge and a former Master of Emmanuel College, Cambridge (1996–2002). He may be best known for his contributions to aeroacoustics, in particular for his work on Concorde. Together with one of his students, David Hawkings, he introduced the far-field integration method in computational aeroacoustics based on Lighthill's acoustic analogy, known as the Ffowcs Williams–Hawkings analogy.

Ffowcs was elected as a member into the National Academy of Engineering in 1995 for contributions to the theory of jet noise, and other aspects of aeroacoustics and hydrodynamics.

== Education and early life ==
Born in Wales on 25 May 1935, Ffowcs Williams was educated at the Great Ayton Friends' School and Derby Technical College. He served an engineering apprenticeship with Rolls-Royce before going to the University of Southampton, he always maintained a strong commitment to bring academic research to bear on industrial problems. He was awarded Bachelor of Science degree and a PhD from the University of Southampton in 1961 for research supervised by Elfyn Richards.

== Career and research ==
He cofounded Topexpress Ltd, a consultancy company in Cambridge specialising in engineering science, was executive consultant to Rolls-Royce and a director of VSEL plc. For 25 years he led the division in which the University of Cambridge's Fluid Mechanics, Aeronautics, Thermodynamics, and Turbomachinery work is concentrated.

He was admitted to his Professorial Fellowship at Emmanuel in 1973; he was the longest-serving professor in the University when he retired from his chair in 2002. He taught engineering for the College but, before becoming Master his main college contribution was serving on the Governing Body and its committees. He was the first holder of the Rank Chair of engineering established in 1972 in the field of acoustics, coming to Cambridge from Imperial College London, where he held the Rolls-Royce Chair in theoretical acoustics. His speciality was noise and vibration caused by unsteady flow. His main achievement was to persuade very good research students to tackle important but interesting problems which ranged from the aeroacoustics of supersonic flight, to the quietening of underwater platforms. His work helped make anti-sound useful for noise control and for stabilising unstable aeromechanical systems.

His doctoral students include David Crighton, Steve Furber, and Ann Dowling.

=== Awards and honours ===
- He was elected a Fellow of the Royal Academy of Engineering (FREng) in 1988
- In 1984 he was awarded the Rayleigh Medal by the UK Institute of Acoustics.
- In 1989 he was awarded the Médaille Étrangère by the French Acoustic Society (SFA).
- In 1995 he was elected a member of the National Academy of Engineering
- For his contributions to the foundations and applications of Aeroacoustics, which have enabled dramatic reductions in the noise of aircraft and submarines he was awarded the Sir Frank Whittle Medal by the Royal Academy of Engineering in 2002.
- He was elected a Fellow of the Royal Aeronautical Society (FRAeS)
- He was elected a Fellow of the Royal Society of Arts (FRSA)
- He was elected a Fellow of the Institute of Physics (FinstP)

== Personal life ==
Williams married Anne Mason in 1959. He died on 12 December 2020.

== Notes ==
Academic offices
Preceded by Norman St John-Stevas	Master of Emmanuel College, Cambridge; 1996–2002	Succeeded by Lord Wilson of Dinton
Awards
Preceded by Tim Berners-Lee	Sir Frank Whittle Medal; 2002	Succeeded by Roland Clift
