= David Weston =

David Weston may refer to:

- David Weston (actor) (born 1938), English actor, director and author
- David Weston (artist) (1935–2011), British industrial artist and author
- David Weston (cricketer) (1930–1977), New Zealand cricketer
- David E. Weston (1929–2001), English acoustician
- David John Weston (1898–?), World War I flying ace
