= Sir Frank Whittle Medal =

Engineering award

The Sir Frank Whittle Medal is awarded annually by the Royal Academy of Engineering to an engineer, normally resident in the United Kingdom, for outstanding and sustained achievement which has contributed to the well-being of the nation. The field of activity in which the medal is awarded changes annually.

Named after Sir Frank Whittle, the award was instituted in 2001.

== Previous winners ==
Sir Frank Whittle Medal winners
Year	Name	Topics
2001	Professor Tim Berners-Lee	for creating the World Wide Web.
2002	Professor John Ffowcs Williams	for contributions to the foundations and applications of Aeroacoustics, which have enabled dramatic reductions in the noise of aircraft and submarines.
2003	Professor Roland Clift	for his leading role in developing the holistic life cycle assessment of products - cradle to grave analysis - and the recognition of environmental and social issues.
2004	Professor Ian Young	for pioneering work on magnetic resonance imaging.
2005	Professor Emeritus Peter John Lawrenson	for engineering innovations in energy.
2006	Michael Ramsay	for pioneering the TiVo technology.
2007	Mike Glover	for planning, design and construction of the Channel Tunnel Rail Link Project (High Speed 1).
2008	Peter Head	for helping to deliver an environmentally sustainable built environment in a rapidly urbanising world.
2009	Professor Sir Michael Brady	for his contributions to medical analysis.
2010	Professor Sir Richard Feachem	for his engineering-based approach to managing aid and controlling virulent diseases.
2012	Dan Chambers	for his product design, innovation and manufacture of specialised sports equipment such as racing wheelchairs.
2013	Professor Lin Li	for laser cleaning techniques.
2014	Professor Peter Wells	for outstanding achievements in medical engineering.
2015	Professor Peter Clarricoats	for his influential achievements in microwave engineering.
2016	Professor Roger Sargent	for championing the application of mathematics and computing to solve engineering problems in the process industries.
2017	Professor Andrew N. Schofield	for pioneering the use of centrifuge modelling for geotechnical and civil engineering.
2018	John Bartlett	for his outstanding contributions to tunnel design and construction.
2019	Robert Benaim	for leading a step-change in prestressed concrete structures and improving the way in which consultants and contractors work together.
2020	Professor Dame Julia Higgins	for her sustained excellence in polymer engineering.
2021	Clive Hickman	for his outstanding career in the automobile industry.
2022	Professor Jacques Heyman	for making vital contributions to structural engineering.
2023	Professor Graham Reed	for pioneering the field of silicon photonics.
2024	Tristram Carfrae	for his inspirational approach to design, his remarkable structures and his leadership in structural engineering.
2025	Fiona Rayment	for her engineering leadership and technical expertise in the nuclear sector.
2026	Professor Dame Wendy Hall	for her extraordinary achievements during a career spanning five decades in leading the development of web science and shaping the UK’s AI strategy
