= John Vernon Bartlett =

British civil engineer (1927–2021)

- Born: 18 June 1927; Wimbledon, London, England
- Died: 17 November 2021 (aged 94)
- Education: Stowe School, Trinity College, Cambridge
- Spouse: Gillian Bartlett
- Children: 4
- Engineering career
- Discipline: Civil,
- Institutions: Institution of Civil Engineers (president - 1982 - 1983)
- Projects: Londons Victoria Line (credited) Uks Channel tunnel (credited) Tower Bridge Mechanism (credited)
- Significant design: Bentonite Tunneling Machine
- Awards: Telford medal Sir Frank Whittle Medal

John Vernon Bartlett CBE FREng (18 June 1927 – 17 November 2021) was a British civil engineer, particularly associated with developments in tunnelling technologies. He was President of the Institution of Civil Engineers from November 1982 to November 1983, and received various industry honours including the Telford and Sir Frank Whittle Medals.

== Early life and career ==
Bartlett was born in London on 18 June 1927. He was an officer cadet in the Royal Engineers and held a regular army commission, being promoted to Second Lieutenant on 20 June 1947. (Bartlett returned to the British Army on 30 November 1978, being commissioned a Major in the Engineer and Railway Staff Corps, an unpaid voluntary unit providing engineering and logistics expertise.)

He had a Master of Arts degree.

Bartlett spent most of his career with consulting engineers Mott, Hay and Anderson from 1957 until his retirement as chairman and senior partner in 1988. He worked on the first Dartford Tunnel, the first tunnelled sections of the Toronto subway and was the project engineer responsible for London's Victoria line. He also had design responsibility for the Channel Tunnel, first as a principal designer for the scheme and following the project's revision in the early 1970s, as a principal design consultant for all civil and geotechnical engineering on the UK section.

He was appointed Commander of the Order of the British Empire in the 1976 New Year Honours, and elected President of the Institution of Civil Engineers for the November 1982 to November 1983 session, and was a founder member and chairman of the British Tunnelling Society.

== Tunnelling expertise ==
John Bartlett's work included the invention of the Bentonite tunnelling machine, the precursor of all the world's tunnel boring machines for loose, sandy soils. Boring tunnels in non-cohesive soils – sands, silts, gravels and mixed ground – is a difficult and often dangerous task, with the tunnel face needing continuous support and a risk of groundwater flooding the works. Tunnelling in such loose soils was possible before the invention of the Bentonite tunnelling machine, but the traditional processes used, such as workers digging by hand under compressed air, were extremely hazardous and expensive.

John Bartlett's solution was inspired by a visit to Milan, where he observed how the city's first metro line had been built using a ‘cut and cover’ method rather than boring tunnels. The engineers had used bentonite clay to support the trenches while they were being excavated. Bentonite clay is frequently used in construction because it is thixotropic: a thick gel when at rest but a liquid when agitated. Bartlett began developing a new type of tunnelling machine that combined slurry trenches with mechanical digging technology.

The result was the Bentonite tunnelling machine, which he patented in 1964. The machine uses pressurised bentonite slurry in a sealed bulkhead behind the cutting face to balance the water pressure in the ground and stabilises the tunnel while supporting rings are installed. The excavated soil is then separated from the slurry, which is recirculated to the cutting face. Bartlett's Bentonite tunnelling machine became the prototype for a whole new class of slurry tunnelling machines and by the end of the 1970s more than 1000 had been used worldwide.

Lord Mair, when President of the Institution of Civil Engineers, said: "There can be no doubt that a major revolution in the worldwide tunneling industry was triggered by John Bartlett’s invention of the Bentonite Tunnelling Machine. It has enabled a rapid increase in tunnel construction around the world, particularly in urban areas, for water supply, sanitation, and transport – with remarkable benefit to humanity."

== Sir Frank Whittle Medal 2018 ==
The Sir Frank Whittle Medal is awarded to an engineer whose sustained achievements have had a profound impact upon their engineering discipline. Academy president Professor Dame Ann Dowling presented the award at the Royal Academy of Engineering's AGM in London to Bartlett on 18 September 2018. On receiving the award, John Bartlett said: "Civil Engineering today is a team game. I hope members of my team will enjoy sharing the recognition given by this award. Many thanks to those who put me forward."

== Personal life and death ==
Bartlett also had a passion for ships. The Bartlett Maritime Research Centre and Library at the National Maritime Museum Cornwall is named after him, marking his 2003 donation of 6,000 volumes of maritime history to add to its now 18,000 volume collection. He also wrote in his spare time.

He died on 17 November 2021, at the age of 94.

Professional and academic associations
| Preceded by Ian McDonald Campbell | President of the Institution of Civil Engineers; November 1982 – November 1983 | Succeeded by James Anthony Gaffney |
