= Ann Dowling =

Engineering professor

Dame Ann Dowling OM DBE FRS FREng
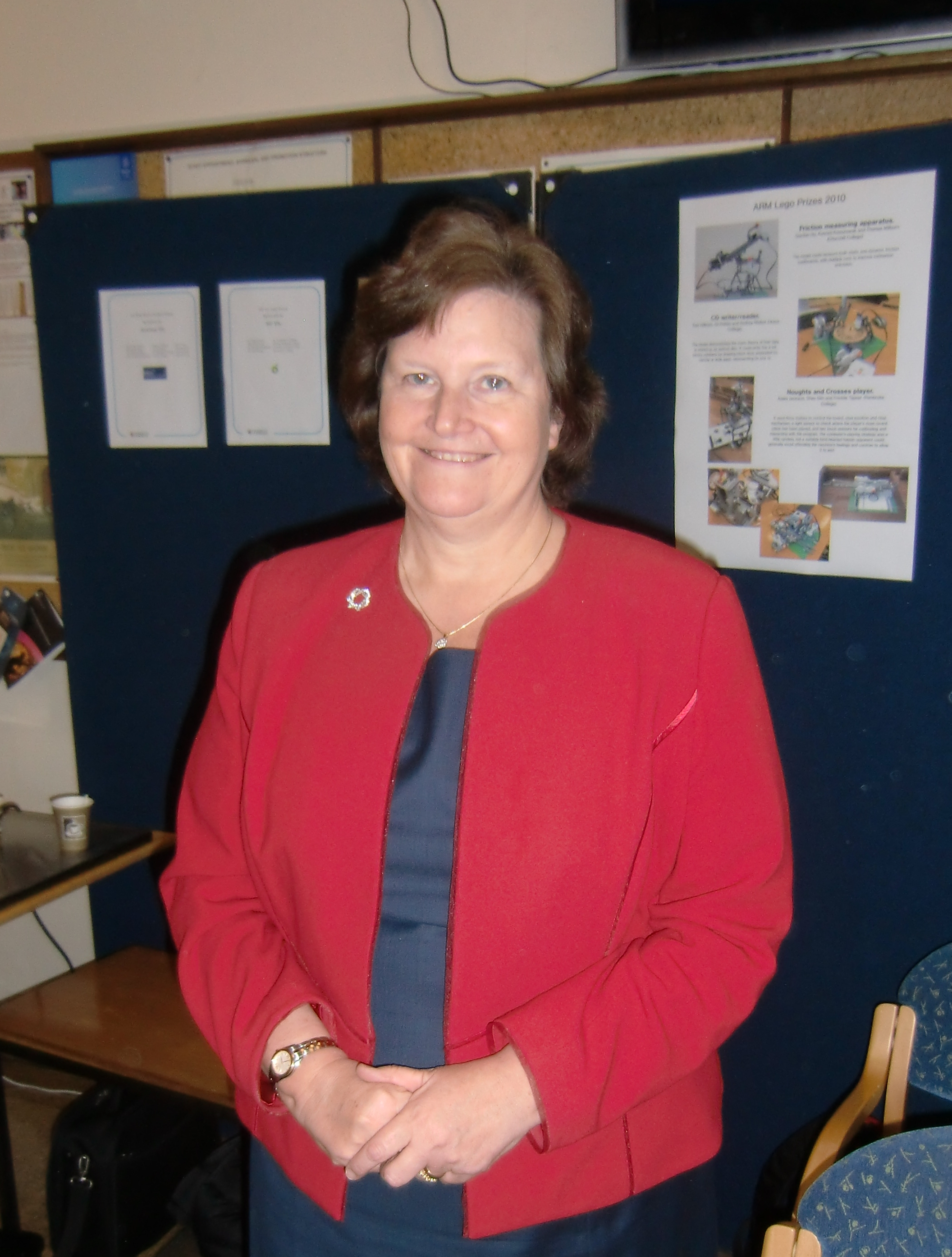
- Dowling in 2011
- Born: Ann Patricia Dowling; 15 July 1952 (age 74)
- Education: Girton College, Cambridge
- Known for: Silent Aircraft Initiative
- Spouse: Thomas Paul Hynes
- Awards: Member of the Order of Merit; Dame Commander of the Order of the British Empire; President of the Royal Academy of Engineering; Fellow of the Royal Society; Royal Medal (2019); Ludwig Prandtl Ring (2019)
- Scientific career
- Fields: Mechanical engineering; Aeroacoustics
- Workplaces: University of Cambridge; Cambridge–MIT Institute; Sidney Sussex College, Cambridge; Caltech; Massachusetts Institute of Technology; BP
- Thesis: Acoustic Sources in Motion (1978)
- Doctoral advisor: John Ffowcs Williams
- Dame Ann Dowling's voice from the BBC programme The Life Scientific, 28 August 2012.
- Website: www.eng.cam.ac.uk/profiles/apd1

Dame Ann Patricia Dowling (born 15 July 1952) is a British mechanical engineer who researches combustion, acoustics and vibration, focusing on efficient, low-emission combustion and reduced road vehicle and aircraft noise. Dowling is a Deputy Vice-Chancellor and Professor of Mechanical Engineering, and from 2009 to 2014 she was Head of the Department of Engineering at the University of Cambridge, where she was the first female professor in 1993. She was President of the Royal Academy of Engineering from 2014 to 2019, the Academy's first female president.

== Education ==
Dowling was educated at Ursuline Convent School, Westgate, Kent, and the University of Cambridge (as a member of Girton College), where after studying mathematics at undergraduate level, and following a summer job at the Royal Aircraft Establishment, she was awarded a PhD degree in 1978. Dowling's doctorate was in aeroacoustics, specifically on the Concorde noise problem.

== Career ==
Dowling's research career has been at University of Cambridge starting as a research fellow in 1977 but she has held visiting posts at the Massachusetts Institute of Technology (Jerome C Hunsaker Visiting Professor, 1999) and at the California Institute of Technology (Moore Distinguished Scholar 2001). Dowling is one of four main panel chairs for the Research Excellence Framework.

On 3 February 2012, BP announced that Dowling was to become a non-executive director with immediate effect. She has been a non-executive board member at BIS since February 2014.

== Awards and honours ==
Dowling was elected a Fellow of the Royal Academy of Engineering (FREng) in 1996 and a Fellow of the Royal Society in 2003. Her FRS nomination reads:

Ann Dowling is a leading authority on developments that are enabling the control of unstable combustion systems in both aeronautics and power generation. She was the first to understand the mechanics of the jet engine instability known as reheat buzz. The two underlying themes of [Dowling's] work are (1) the interaction of sound with unsteady flow, and (2) the control of aeroacoustic instabilities. Her publications range from problem-defining fundamental papers to descriptions of the technology behind successful practical applications. Her research and academic leadership are admired internationally and she is a strong research leader.

Dowling was elected an international member of the National Academy of Engineering in 2008 for advances in acoustics and unsteady flow, and for leadership in collaborative research between industry and universities.

In February 2013, Dowling was listed as one of the 100 most powerful women in the United Kingdom by Woman's Hour on BBC Radio 4. and was the subject of an episode of The Life Scientific in 2012.

Dowling is a Patron of the Women's Engineering Society (WES).

In January 2014, Dowling was nominated for election as President of the Royal Academy of Engineering. She took up the position in September 2014, and in that role chaired a 2015 review (the "Dowling Review") of business–university research collaboration, published in July 2015.

She was appointed a CBE in 2002 and promoted to DBE in 2007. In 2016, she was appointed to the Order of Merit.

The James Watt International Gold Medal was awarded to her in 2016 by the Institution of Mechanical Engineers "for her work associated with efficient, low emission combustion; and understanding, modelling and reducing the noise from cars, helicopters and fixed-wing aircraft".

In November 2017, Dowling was elected to the Chinese Academy of Engineering alongside 18 foreign individuals including Bill Gates and L. Rafael Reif.

In 2018, for her continued work in the engineering industry, Dowling was awarded an honorary degree of Doctor of Science, from Royal Holloway University of London.

In 2019, she received the Royal Medal.

Professional and academic associations
Preceded by Sir John Parker	President of the Royal Academy of Engineering; September 2014–	Succeeded by Incumbent
