= Peter Wells (medical physicist) =

British medical physicist (1936–2017)

Professor Peter Wells CBE FRS FMedSci FREng FIET FInstP FLSW
- Born: Peter Neil Temple Wells; 19 May 1936; Bristol, England
- Died: 22 April 2017 (aged 80)
- Education: Aston University
- Occupation: Academic researcher
- Known for: Ultrasound
- Awards: Duddell Medal and Prize (2006); FREng (2004); FMedSci (2005); Royal Medal (2013); FRS (2003)
- Scientific career
- Fields: Electrical engineering Medical physics
- Workplaces: Cardiff University; University of Bristol
- Website: www.engin.cf.ac.uk/whoswho/profile.asp?RecordNo=363

Peter Neil Temple Wells (19 May 1936 in Bristol, England – 22 April 2017) was a British medical physicist who played a major role in the application of ultrasound technology in medicine.

== Education ==
Wells was educated at Birmingham College of Advanced Technology and the University of Bristol where he was awarded his PhD in 1966.

== Career and research ==
Wells made a number of notable contributions to the application of engineering and physics in medicine – he was the originator and developer of instruments for ultrasonic surgery and ultrasonic power measurement, as well as the two-dimensional, articulated-arm ultrasonic general purpose scanner and the water-immersion ultrasonic breast scanner.

He demonstrated ultrasonic-pulsed Doppler range gating, and was the discoverer of the ultrasonic Doppler signal characteristic of malignant tumour neovascularisation. He investigated ultrasonic bioeffects and formulated ultrasonic safety guidelines and conditions for prudent use of ultrasonic diagnosis.

Wells led multidisciplinary studies of ultrasonic diagnosis and made major contributions to the advancement of light transmission, electrical impedance and nuclear magnetic resonance imaging, as well as to interventional telepresence. He also proposed a novel philosophy of medical imaging. In the early part of the 21st century, he was developing ultrasonic Doppler and phase-insensitive tomography.

== Honours and awards ==
- 1983 Fellow of the Royal Academy of Engineering
- 2003 Fellow of the Royal Society
- 2005 Fellow of the Academy of Medical Sciences
- 2006 Duddell Medal and Prize
- 2009 Appointed Commander of the Order of the British Empire (CBE) in the 2009 New Year Honours
- 2010 Founding Fellow of the Learned Society of Wales
- 2013 Royal Medal from the Royal Society
- 2014 Sir Frank Whittle Medal
