= Elfyn Richards =

Elfyn Richards OBE
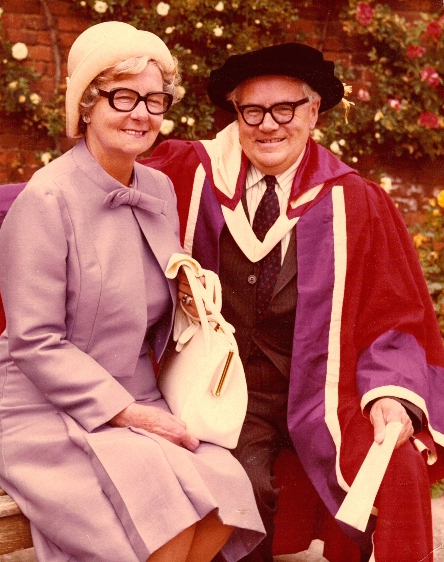
- Elfyn Richards with first wife Eluned
- Born: Elfyn John Richards; 28 December 1914; Barry, Glamorgan
- Died: 7 September 1995 (aged 80)
- Education: University of Cambridge
- Scientific career
- Workplaces: University of Southampton
- Doctoral students: John Ffowcs Williams

Professor Elfyn John Richards (28 December 1914 – 7 September 1995) was a Welsh aeronautical engineer and acoustical engineer, the first professor of either of these subjects at University of Southampton, where he founded the Institute of Sound and Vibration Research, and was the second Vice-Chancellor of Loughborough University of Technology.

== Education and early life ==
Richards (sometimes known as "Sam") was born in Barry, Glamorgan on 28 December 1914, and studied at Barry Grammar School, University College of Wales, Aberystwyth, and St John's College, Cambridge, where he read mathematics and physics.

== Career and research ==
Richards began his career at the Bristol Aeroplane Company, then moved to the National Physical Laboratory studying aerofoil design. In 1945 he became Chief Aerodynamicist at Vickers-Armstrong, working on designs for the Vickers Valiant, Vickers Viscount and Vickers Valiant aircraft. During this period he developed a research interest in aircraft noise. In 1950 he was appointed the first Professor of Aeronautical Engineering at Southampton University, and in 1963 became Professor of Applied Acoustics at the same university and founded the Institute of Sound and Vibration Research. From 1967 to 1975 he was Vice-Chancellor of Loughborough University of Technology. After this he returned to Southampton University, taking up a chair in the Institute of Sound and Vibration Research.

=== Awards and honours ===
Richards was awarded the OBE in 1958 for his work on noise. (believe it was for the Acoustic design concepts of the de Havilland Comet) He was awarded the Taylor Gold Medal of the Royal Aeronautical Society, the James Watt Medal of the Institution of Civil Engineers, and the Silver Medal of the Royal Society of Arts. He served as President of the British Acoustical Society (1968–70) and President of the Society of Environmental Engineers (1971–73). He was the 1986 recipient of the Rayleigh Medal of the Institute of Acoustics (United Kingdom). He is commemorated in Elvyn Richards student accommodation at Loughborough University.

Richards also received an Honorary Doctorate from Heriot-Watt University in 1983

=== Publications ===
Noise and Acoustic Fatigue in Aeronautics by Elfyn John Richards & D. J. Mead (Wiley) ISBN 0-471-71944-7

== Personal life ==
Richards married 3 times: first in 1941 to Eluned Jones (d. 1978) with whom he had 3 daughters, then in 1986 to Olive Meakin (d. 1989) and in 1990 to Miriam Davidson, who survived him. He died in Romsey, Hampshire on 7 September 1995.

Academic offices
Preceded by Herbert Haslegrave	Vice-Chancellor of Loughborough University; 1967–1975	Succeeded by Sir Clifford Charles Butler
