= Aeolian sound =

Tones generated by wind passing through or over objects

Aeolian sound or Aeolian tone is sound that is produced by wind when it passes over or through objects.

== History ==
Historically, Aeolus was the Greek ruler of the winds, and the Ancient Greeks believed these sounds were the voice of Aeolus.

The earliest known observations about Aeolian sounds from a "scientific" viewpoint were made by Athanasius Kircher in 1650.

== Physical cause ==
An Aeolian tone is produced when air passes over an obstacle, resulting in trailing vortices with oscillatory behavior. These eddies can have strong periodic components, resulting in a steady tone. This phenomenon is the main topic of aeroacoustics. For air moving over a cylinder, empirical data shows that an Aeolian tone will be produced with the frequency

$$f_{\text{Aeolian}}\ =\ \frac{\mbox{St} \cdot V}{D}$$,

where $V$ is the air velocity, $D$ is the diameter of the cylinder, and $\mbox{St}$ is the Strouhal number, which has a value of about 0.2.

== Notable occurrences ==
Aeolian sounds can be produced in the rigging of a sail-powered ship. The vortex trails produced as the wind passes over a rope produce a sound with a frequency that varies with the velocity of the wind and the thickness of the rope. Each doubling of the wind velocity results in an octave increase in the tone, allowing up to a six octave variation in a strong, gusty wind. Ships may also carry Helmholtz resonators that amplify these sounds. Aeolian sounds can also be heard among the openings in limestone cliffs, and from ends of, or openings in pipes.

Some songs have been written to emulate these varying wind sounds, such as the "Étude Op. 25, No. 1 (the 'Aeolian Harp Etude')" and the "The Winter Wind" by Frédéric Chopin or "Tempest" by Ludwig van Beethoven.

Aeolean sound was heard around San Francisco, California beginning June 5, 2020, as a consequence of high winds and new walkway slats installed on the Golden Gate Bridge.

== See also ==
- Aeolian harp
- Sound power
- Kármán vortex street
