= Rayleigh Medal =

The Rayleigh Medal is a prize awarded annually by the Institute of Acoustics for "outstanding contributions to acoustics". The prize is named after John Strutt, 3rd Baron Rayleigh. It should not be confused with the medal of the same name awarded by the Institute of Physics.

== List of recipients ==
Source: Institute of Acoustics

- 1970 David E. Weston
- 1975 Peter Hubert Parkin
- 1977 Leonid M. Brekhovskikh
- 1978 Edward G. S. Paige
- 1979 Edgar Albert George Shaw
- 1980 Philip E. Doak
- 1981 Karl Uno Ingard
- 1982 G. B. Warburton
- 1983 Eugen J. Skudrzyk
- 1984 John Ffowcs Williams
- 1985 Peter Westervelt
- 1986 Elfyn John Richards
- 1987 Manfred Robert Schroeder
- 1988 David George Crighton
- 1989 Henning E. von Gierke
- 1990 Frank J. Fahy
- 1991 Manfred Heckl
- 1992 James Lighthill
- 1993 Michel Bruneau
- 1994 Edward F. Evans
- 1995 Richard H. Lyon
- 1996 Keith Attenborough
- 1997 Leif Bjørnø
- 1998 William A. Ainsworth
- 1999 George C. Maling
- 2000 Victor Krylov
- 2001 Hideki Tachibana
- 2002 Philip A. Nelson
- 2003 Hugo Fastl
- 2004 Alan Cummings
- 2005 Heinrich Kuttruff
- 2006 Michael Fleming E. Barron
- 2007 Michael Howe
- 2008 Chris H. Harrison
- 2009 Colin Hansen
- 2010 Bob Craik
- 2011 John Bradley
- 2012 Yui Wei Lam
- 2013 Jacques Yves Guigné
- 2014 Timothy Grant Leighton
- 2014 Leo Beranek
- 2015 Sir Harold Marshall
- 2016 Rupert Thornely-Taylor
- 2017 Juan Antonio Gallego Juárez
- 2018 David John Thompson
- 2019 Claus Elberling
- 2020 Robin S. Langley
- 2021 Michael Vorländer
- 2022 Jian Kang
- 2023 Stephen Stansfeld
- 2024 Malcolm Crocker
- 2025 Phillip Joseph

== See also ==
- List of physics awards
