= Leif Bjørnø =

Danish acoustician

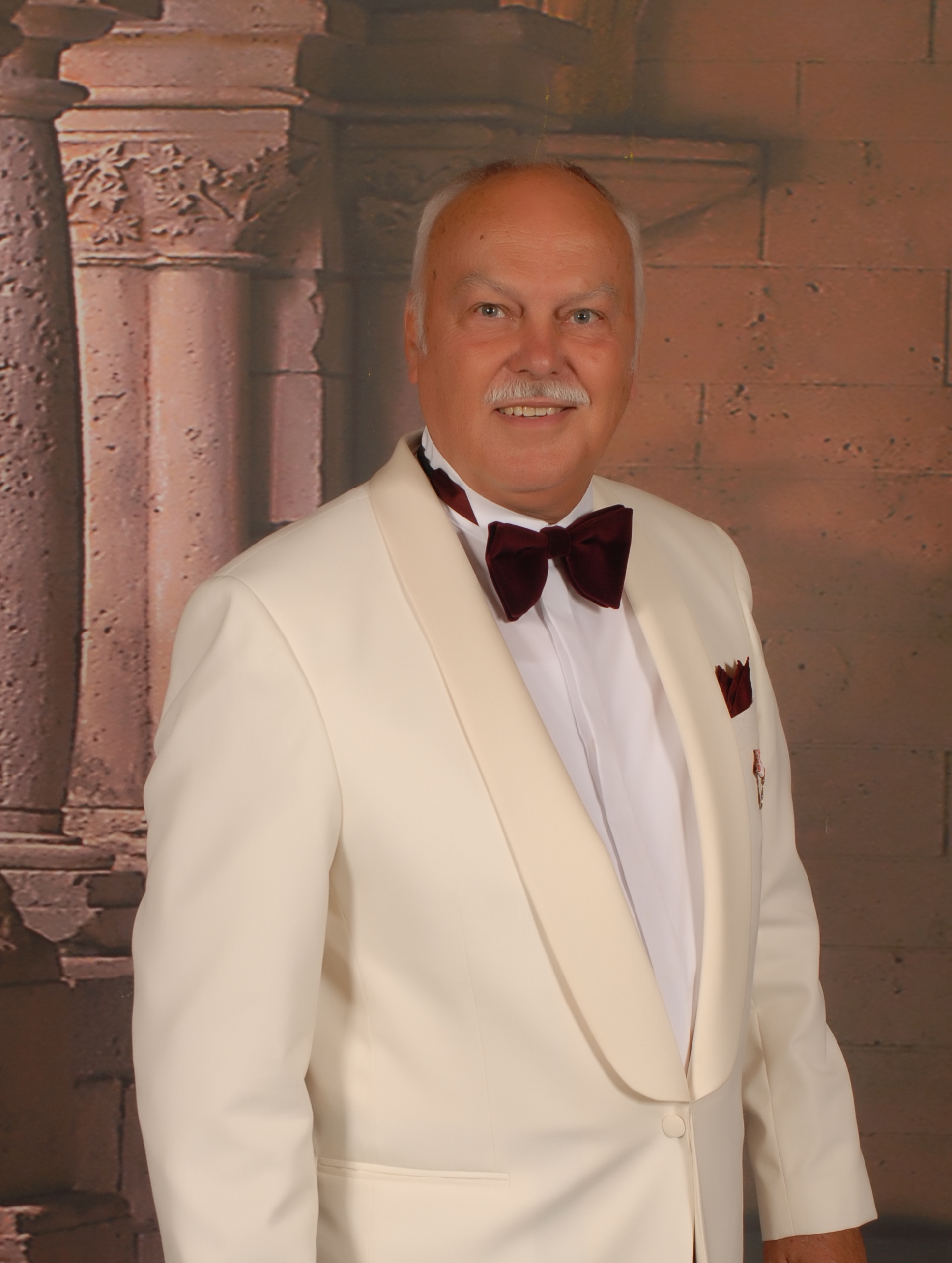
- Leif Bjørnø
- Born: Leif Bjørnø; 30 March 1937; Svendborg
- Died: 24 October 2015 (aged 78)
- Education: Technical University of Denmark
- Occupation: Acoustician
- Parent(s): Svend Aage Valdemar and Elna Marie Jensen
- Relatives: wife Irina Bjørnø

Leif Bjørnø (30 March 1937 – 24 October 2015) was born on 30 March 1937 in Svendborg, Denmark. Son of Svend Aage Valdemar and Elna Marie Jensen. Leif Bjørnø, professor and well known acoustician. Named Knight of the Order of Dannebrog, Her Majesty the Queen of Denmark 1991, recipient Gold medal Society Francaise d'Acoustique, 1995, Lord Rayleigh's Gold medal, London, 1997, The Hartmann Prize, Copenhagen, 1999, Fellow of the Acoustical Society of America, a Life Fellow of the Institute of Electrical and Electronics Engineers.

== Education ==
Leif Bjørnø was student at University Roskilde (Denmark), 1956. Received degree of Master of Science in Mechanical Engineering, Technical University Denmark, Lyngby, 1962, Doctor of Philosophy, Technical University Denmark, Lyngby, 1967.

Diploma, Imperial College, London, 1971. Doctor of Philosophy (honorary), University Crete, 1996. Professor (honorary), Harbin University Engineering, 1994.

== Engineering and scientific career ==
Leif Bjørnø had the following positions: assistant professor Technical University Denmark Lyngby, 1967–1969, associate professor, 1970–1978, professor industrial acoustics, since 1978. Retired, 2000. Managing director UltraTech Holding 2000–2012. Visiting professor Imperial College, London, 1969–1970.

Chairman mechanical engineering, vice president Academy Technology Sciences, 1989–1993. Chairman board directors Brunata Aktieselskab, Syd-Tek, Food Tech. Member of Board directors Reson Aktieselskab, Reson Inc., Denmark and United States of America, president 2d European Congress Underwater Acoustics, 1994.

Leif Bjørnø served as chairman or member of the scientific committee for the 2010, 2012, and 2013 Sea Side Security (SSS) Conferences. Leif Bjørnø was the joint conference as chairman – together with Professor John S. Papadakis – for the 2005–2012 International Conferences on Underwater Acoustic measurements held in Greece. He was also the organizer and joint conference chairman with Professor Papadakis of the 2012, 2013, and 2015 International Conference and Exhibition on Underwater Acoustics (UA).

== Membership ==
Leif Bjørnø has been a visiting professor in university departments in Chile, China, Greece, South Africa, United Kingdom, and the United States.

He was the chairman mechanical engineering, vice president Academy Technology Sciences, 1989–1993. Chairman board directors Brunata Aktieselskab, Syd-Tek, Food Tech Aktieselskab. Board directors Reson Aktieselskab, Reson Inc. United States of America, president 2d European Congress Underwater Acoustics, 1994.

== Publications ==
- Applied Underwater Acoustics, ISBN 978-0128112403
- Fluid Mechanics, 1972.
- Author or co-author 8 books, 2 translation.
- Editor Ultrasonics, 1973–1994.
- Contributor 350 articles to international journals, conference proceedings and books.

== Awards ==
- 1991 he was named a Knight of the Order of Dannebrog by Her Majesty, Margrethe II, Queen of Denmark
- 1995 the French Acoustical Society Gold Medal
- 1995 the first recipient of the International Congress on Ultrasonics Gold Whistle award
- 1997 the Lord Rayleigh Medal by the UK Institute of Acoustics.
- 1999 the Danish Hartmann Prize, in Copenhagen for his outstanding contributions to the Danish community and his profession
- 2005 the Medal of Merit and Johannes Hevelius Medal by the Gdansk University of Technology
- 2006 Ignacy Malecki Medal by the Polish Acoustical Society.

Leif was professor honoris causa at the University of Harbin, China, and he was a Doctor of Philosophy honoris causa at the University of Crete, Greece.
