= George E. Davis Medal =

The George E. Davis Medal is a medal of the IChemE given not more frequently than every three years, for achievements in chemical engineering. It is named after George E. Davis.

== Davis medallists ==
Source: IChemE

- 1965 - Arthur Joseph Victor Underwood (1897-1972), consulting chemical engineer
- 1969 - Frank E. Ireland, Chief Alkali Inspector
- 1973 - J. M. Coulson
- 1977 - Sir Denis Rooke
- 1982 - Sir Maurice Hodgson
- 1988 - Sir Geoffrey Allen
- 1991 - Jacques Villermaux
- 1998 - Ian Robinson, CEO, Scottish Power
- 2001 - Sir David Harrison
- 2004 - Sir David King
- 2011 - Andrew N. Liveris
- 2016 - Roland Clift

== See also ==
- List of engineering awards
- List of chemistry awards
- List of prizes named after people
