= Irina Bjørnø =

Russian writer and former physicist

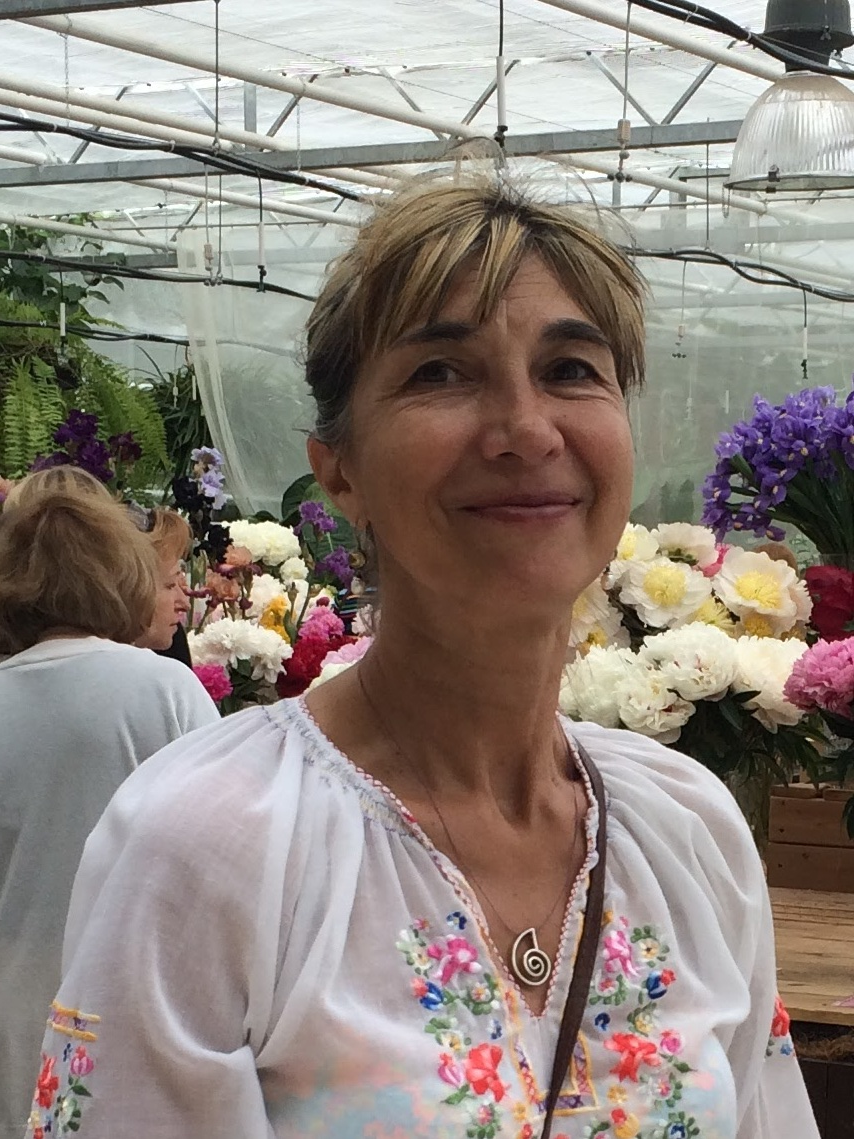
- Irina Bjørnø
- Born: Irina Nikolajevna Kozhevnikova; 16 January 1959 (age 67); Moscow, Russia
- Other name: Irina Bjørnø
- Education: Moscow State University
- Occupations: Writer and publisher
- Known for: Youtube blogging
- Parent(s): Nikolaj Kozhevnikov and Luisa Kozhevnikova
- Relatives: sister Alexandra; husband Leif Bjørnø

Irina Bjørnø (born 16 January 1959 in Moscow, Russia) is a Russian-born Danish writer and former physicist.

== Early life and education ==
Bjørnø graduated from Moscow State University, Physical Department, specializing in non-linear wave propagation in laser media in Moscow in 1984. In 1987, she earned a PhD at the General Physics Institute in Moscow.

== Career ==
Bjørnø has worked as associate professor in Danish Technical University since 1992, where she guided PhD students and run European Union projects.

In 1998, she established Ultratech (engineering consultancy in ultrasounds projects for applications in industry), where she was the director.

In 2000, she created a health clinic where she offered Qigong, Yoga and life-development courses.

In 2011, she start writing. She established a publishing company Belbooks - "Books for Easy living" promoting healthy lifestyles, peace and friendship.

Bjørnø has worked with a broad range of subjects, as poetry and novels - and media. She is a YouTube blogger. She writes in international blogs and newspapers.

From 2015, Bjørnø focused on poetry.

== Selected works ==
=== Books ===
- Письма к Президенту Путину - часть 1 - размышления о королевском социализме в виде писем к Русскому Президенту
- В доме на Садовой (приключения девочки Цацы, котора жила во времена социалистического строительства)
- Сны Иисуса - Пасхальная мистерия
- Пересмешник - сатирические рассказы и стихи
- Калейдоскоп 2013 Искатели приключений - сборник рассказов
- Медвежий Остров - рассказы о природе и животных
- Планета Вампиров - политическая фантазия
- Доброе Утро (для самых маленьких) - стихи и мультфильмы
- Приключения кота Колбаскина
- Как выучить датский язык за 1 час
- Guidance to...happy Death????
- Secrets of Energy in your Life
- Happy Families or How to build one
- De Gyldne regler for Sund Kost (in Danish)
- Cougar
- Kaleidoscope (in Danish)
- 10 Danske Lignelser (in Danish)

== Awards ==
- "Writer of the year" - "The Golden Pen Nomination" (in Russia) in 2012-2017 and "Poet of the Year" in Russia in 2013–2017.
- First prize for her anti-war novel "The Pilot" in 2011 (Amazon, USA).
- "Book of the year", Frankfurt-Berlin - nomination "Pretty stories" in 2015–2017.
- Medal from Russia "For contribution in national culture" - 2015.
