= David Crighton =

British mathematician and physicist (1942–2000)

- Born: David George Crighton; 15 November 1942; Llandudno, Wales
- Died: 12 April 2000 (aged 57); Cambridge, England
- Education: St John's College, Cambridge
- Known for: Fluid mechanics, acoustics
- Awards: Fellow of the Royal Society
- Scientific career
- Workplaces: Woolwich Polytechnic; Imperial College London; University of Leeds; University of Cambridge
- Thesis: Wave motion and vibration induced by turbulent flow (1968)
- Doctoral advisor: John Ffowcs Williams

David George Crighton, FRS (15 November 1942 – 12 April 2000) was a British mathematician and physicist.

== Life ==
Crighton was born in Llandudno, North Wales, where his mother, Violet Grace Garrison, had been sent because of the bombing of London during the Second World War. He did not become interested in mathematics until his last two years at Watford Grammar School for Boys. He entered St John's College, Cambridge, in 1961 and started lecturing at Woolwich Polytechnic (today University of Greenwich) in 1964, having completed only his bachelor's degree.

A few years later he met John Ffowcs Williams and started to work for him at Imperial College London, while simultaneously studying for his doctorate (awarded in 1969) at the same place. In 1974, he was appointed as a research fellow in the Department of Engineering at the University of Cambridge. However, he never took up this post, but instead accepted the chair in applied mathematics at the University of Leeds, which he held until 1986.

He then returned to Cambridge as Professor of Applied Mathematics in succession to George Batchelor.

He became Master of Jesus College in 1997 and held that post until his death. He was also head of the Applied Mathematics and Theoretical Physics Department (DAMTP) in Cambridge between 1991 and 2000.

Away from his mathematical work, Crighton was a devotee of the music of Richard Wagner, as well as music for the piano.

== Work ==
Crighton's scientific interests were primarily in the theory of waves and aeroacoustics, as well as in some areas of fluid mechanics. He published over 120 papers. He also published one book in 1977 entitled Introduction to Wiener-Hopf methods in acoustics and vibration. Crighton has also developed council initiatives to fund the research of nonlinear mathematics.

In his first paper, Crighton studied the sound wave associated with turbulent flow over a discontinuous surface formed by two semi-infinite flexible planes. Over the years, he worked broadly in the fields of acoustics, equation theory and quasi-diabatic systems including solitons. This included works on the generalised Burgers' equation and inverse scattering theory.

Of his research, Crighton, with FG Leppington, coupled the method of matched asymptotic expansions and the Wiener-Hopf method to study the scattering of sound waves by solids. Other highlights include his study of how vortices in the flow behind jet engines interact with solid boundaries to produce sound, and his analysis on the states of vibrations of a fluid-loaded rib plate.

The distinction of his work was recognised by the award of the Rayleigh Medal of the Institute of Acoustics, the Per Bruel Gold Medal of the American Society of Mechanical Engineers and the Otto Laporte Award of the American Physical Society.

== David Crighton Medal ==
The Institute of Mathematics and its Applications and the London Mathematical Society instituted the David Crighton Medal in 2002 in honour of Crighton. The award is made biennially, and was first presented in 2003. Holders of the medal include Frank Kelly, Peter Neumann, Keith Moffatt, Christopher Zeeman, John Ball, David Abrahams and Alain Goriely.

Academic offices
Preceded by Colin Renfrew	Master of Jesus College, Cambridge; 1997 - 2000	Succeeded by Robert Mair
