= Philip Nelson (engineer) =

British acoustical engineer (born 1952)

Philip Nelson CBE FREng
- Born: Philip Arthur Nelson; 1952 (age 73–74); Bishop's Stortford, Hertfordshire, England
- Education: University of Southampton (BSc, PhD)
- Known for: Active noise control Virtual acoustic imaging
- Awards: Tyndall Medal (1992); Rayleigh Medal (2002); CBE (2018)
- Scientific career
- Fields: Acoustics, signal processing, fluid dynamics, control systems
- Workplaces: University of Southampton; Engineering and Physical Sciences Research Council

Philip Arthur Nelson CBE FREng (born 1952) is a British engineer and acoustician. He is Professor of Acoustics at the Institute of Sound and Vibration Research (ISVR) at the University of Southampton, and from 2014 to 2018 was Chief Executive of the Engineering and Physical Sciences Research Council (EPSRC).

Nelson is known for research on active noise control and on the reproduction of sound fields for virtual acoustic imaging. With Stephen Elliott he co-authored the 1992 monograph Active Control of Sound. He was appointed Commander of the Order of the British Empire in the 2018 New Year Honours for services to UK engineering and science.

== Early life and education ==
Nelson was born in 1952 in Bishop's Stortford, Hertfordshire, and educated at Colchester Royal Grammar School. He read mechanical engineering at the University of Southampton, graduating with first-class honours in 1974, and remained at the university for doctoral work at the ISVR until 1978, receiving a PhD in sound and vibration studies in 1981. His doctoral research concerned aerodynamic sound production in low-speed flow ducts and the fluid dynamics of flow excited resonance, work published in the Journal of Sound and Vibration

== Career ==
=== University of Southampton ===
From 1978 to 1982 Nelson worked as a research, development and consulting engineer at Sound Attenuators Ltd, the company that had sponsored both his undergraduate and postgraduate education. He returned to the ISVR as a lecturer in 1982, in part through the Science and Engineering Research Council's Special Replacement Scheme, a programme intended to bring younger researchers into academic posts, and became a senior lecturer in 1988. He was appointed Professor of Acoustics in 1994, and was a visiting professor at Pennsylvania State University in 1995.

Nelson was the founding director of the Rolls-Royce University Technology Centre in Gas Turbine Noise at Southampton from 1999 to 2001, and directed the ISVR from 2001 to 2005. He served as the university's Pro Vice-Chancellor for Research and Enterprise from 2005 to 2013, leading Southampton's submissions to the 2008 Research Assessment Exercise and the 2014 Research Excellence Framework (REF), and chairing the REF 2014 sub-panel for general engineering.

He has been a director of several university spin-out companies and has served on the boards of the University of Southampton Science Park and of the SETsquared partnership of the universities of Southampton, Bristol, Bath and Surrey, as well as on the Confederation of British Industry South East Regional Council. In 2013 he was a co-founder of the Science and Engineering South consortium, formed by Southampton with the universities of Oxford and Cambridge, Imperial College London and University College London. Nelson publicly rejected suggestions that the grouping amounted to the largest research universities acting against the interests of the wider sector, describing it instead as a means of sharing major equipment at a time of constrained funding.

In 2020 he served as interim Dean of Southampton's Faculty of Engineering and Physical Sciences, following the departure of Bashir Al-Hashimi to King's College London. He was succeeded by Michael Butler on 1 January 2021.

=== EPSRC and Research Councils UK ===
Nelson's appointment as chief executive and deputy chair of the EPSRC was announced in January 2014 by the then Minister for Universities and Science, David Willetts, following open competition. He took up the post on 1 April 2014 on a four-year term, succeeding David Delpy, and was seconded from Southampton for its duration. At the time the EPSRC invested around £800 million a year of public money and managed a research portfolio of some £2.5 billion.

Nelson took office after a period of friction between the council and parts of the research community, and made consultation a stated priority, undertaking a programme of meetings with universities and learned societies while the council developed its strategic plan. He gave evidence to parliamentary select committees on research funding and infrastructure on several occasions.

From October 2015 he additionally chaired the executive group of Research Councils UK, the strategic partnership of the seven UK research councils. In that capacity he gave evidence to the House of Commons Science and Technology Committee in December 2015 on Sir Paul Nurse's review of the research councils. When UK Research and Innovation (UKRI) came into existence on 1 April 2018, bringing the research councils under a single body, Nelson agreed to serve for a further six months as EPSRC's Executive Chair to assist the transition.

=== Later work ===
Nelson returned to the ISVR as Professor of Acoustics. He has served on a Council of Canadian Academies expert panel on research funding. He has also served as a member of the Royal Academy of Engineering's committee for the MacRobert Award, which selects the finalists and winner of the Academy's annual prize for UK engineering innovation. He also chairs the governance board for the Cancer Research UK Convergence Science Centre at Imperial College London and the Institute of Cancer Research.

== Research ==
Nelson's research interests span acoustics, vibration, signal processing, control systems and fluid dynamics. Working with Stephen Elliott at the ISVR, he developed methods for cancelling unwanted sound by generating a second, opposing sound field, an approach applied to the reduction of propeller-induced cabin noise in aircraft and subsequently adopted in commercial aviation. The two set out the underlying theory in Active Control of Sound (1992), and a companion volume on vibration followed in 1996 with C. R. Fuller.

A second strand of his work concerns the reproduction and control of sound fields, including inverse filtering, crosstalk cancellation and the synthesis of virtual acoustic images over loudspeakers. This research, carried out with his former doctoral student Takashi Takeuchi, underpins the optimal source distribution (OPSODIS) method of three-dimensional sound reproduction, developed jointly by the ISVR and Japan's Kajima Corporation and commercialised through the spin-out Opsodis Ltd, of which Nelson is a director.

He has also worked on inverse problems in acoustics, including the estimation of acoustic source strength, and on the automatic control of boundary layer flow. More recently he has applied neural networks to the classification of acoustic signals, to sound source localisation and to the modelling of the human auditory system.

He is the author or co-author of two books and more than 120 papers in refereed journals, and is named on some 30 granted patents. According to Google Scholar, his publications have been cited more than 20,000 times, and he has an h-index of 63.

== Awards and honours ==
Nelson received the Tyndall Medal of the Institute of Acoustics jointly with Stephen Elliott in 1992, and the Institute's Rayleigh Medal in 2002. The Rayleigh Medal is the Institute's premier award, given for outstanding contributions to acoustics.

He became a Chartered Engineer in 1992 and was elected a Fellow of the Institution of Mechanical Engineers and of the Institute of Acoustics in 1997, of the Royal Academy of Engineering in 2002 and of the Institution of Engineering and Technology in 2016. He is also a Fellow of the Acoustical Society of America.

Nelson served as President of the International Commission for Acoustics from 2004 to 2007.

He was appointed Commander of the Order of the British Empire in the 2018 New Year Honours for services to UK engineering and science.

== Personal life ==
Nelson married in 1979 and has two sons.

== Selected publications ==
=== Books ===
- Nelson, P. A.; Elliott, S. J. (1992). Active Control of Sound. London: Academic Press. ISBN 978-0125154253.
- Fuller, C. R.; Elliott, S. J.; Nelson, P. A. (1996). Active Control of Vibration. London: Academic Press. ISBN 978-0122694400.

=== Articles ===
- Nelson, P. A.; Morfey, C. L. (1981). "Aerodynamic sound production in low speed flow ducts". Journal of Sound and Vibration. 79 (2): 263–289.
- Nelson, P. A.; Curtis, A. R. D.; Elliott, S. J.; Bullmore, A. J. (1987). "The minimum power output of free field point sources and the active control of sound". Journal of Sound and Vibration. 116 (3): 397–414.
- Elliott, S. J.; Stothers, I. M.; Nelson, P. A. (1987). "A multiple error LMS algorithm and its application to the active control of sound and vibration". IEEE Transactions on Acoustics, Speech, and Signal Processing. 35 (10): 1423–1434.
- Nelson, P. A.; Hamada, H.; Elliott, S. J. (1992). "Adaptive inverse filters for stereophonic sound reproduction". IEEE Transactions on Signal Processing. 40 (7): 1621–1632.
- Nelson, P. A. (1994). "Active control of acoustic fields and the reproduction of sound". Journal of Sound and Vibration. 177 (4): 447–477.
- Kirkeby, O.; Nelson, P. A.; Hamada, H.; Orduña-Bustamante, F. (1998). "Fast deconvolution of multichannel systems using regularization". IEEE Transactions on Speech and Audio Processing. 6 (2): 189–194.
- Kirkeby, O.; Nelson, P. A.; Hamada, H. (1998). "The 'Stereo Dipole': a virtual source imaging system using two closely spaced loudspeakers". Journal of the Audio Engineering Society. 46 (5): 387–395.
- Nelson, P. A.; Yoon, S. H. (2000). "Estimation of acoustic source strength by inverse methods: Part I, conditioning of the inverse problem". Journal of Sound and Vibration. 233 (4): 643–668.
- Nelson, P. A. (2001). "A review of some inverse problems in acoustics". International Journal of Acoustics and Vibration. 6 (3): 118–134.
- Takeuchi, T.; Nelson, P. A. (2002). "Optimal source distribution for binaural synthesis over loudspeakers". Journal of the Acoustical Society of America. 112 (6): 2786–2797.
- Fazi, F. M.; Nelson, P. A. (2013). "Sound field reproduction as an equivalent acoustical scattering problem". Journal of the Acoustical Society of America. 134 (5): 3721–3729.
- Paul, V. S.; Nelson, P. A. (2021). "Matrix analysis for fast learning of neural networks with application to the classification of acoustic spectra". Journal of the Acoustical Society of America. 149 (6): 4119–4133.
