= Peter Head (civil engineer) =

Civil and structural engineer

Peter Head CBE FREng
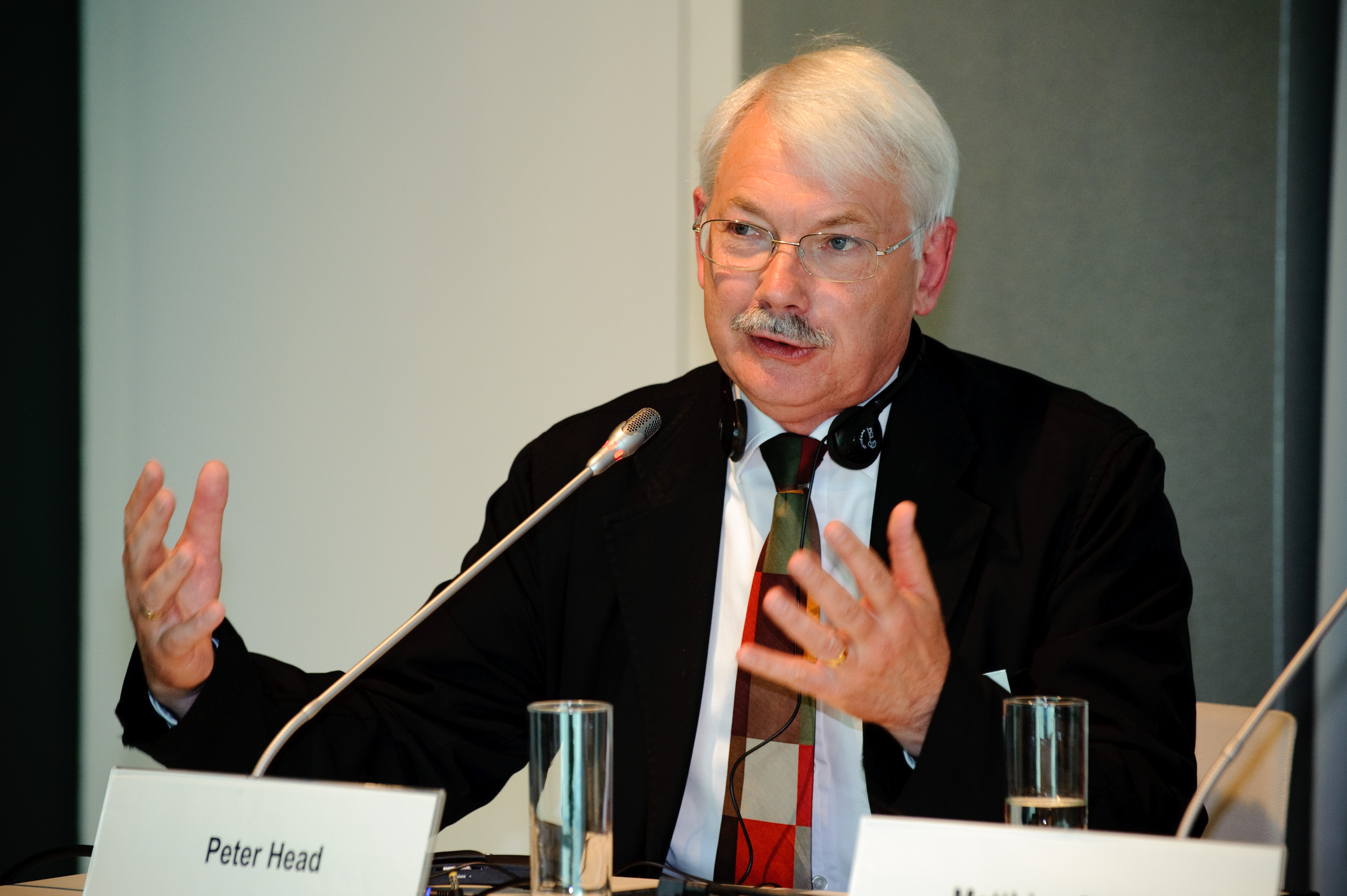
- Peter Head in 2010
- Born: United Kingdom
- Education: Imperial College London, UK
- Known for: Eco-city
- Awards: Sir Frank Whittle Medal (2009); FREng (1996); OBE (1998); CBE (2011)
- Scientific career
- Fields: Civil and structural engineering
- Workplaces: Arup, UK

Peter Richard Head is a British civil and structural engineer. Since 2004, he led the global planning practice at Arup, UK. Currently, he is CEO of Ecological Sequestration Trust, based in London, UK.

== Early life ==
Born in 1947, Peter was educated at the Imperial College London and graduated with a degree in Civil Engineering in 1969.

== Career ==
In 1980, Peter joined Maunsell Group and later became its CEO in 2001. While there, he pioneered the use of composite materials for bridges. Later, Peter joined Arup UK in 2004, working on civil and structural engineering projects for Asia, Europe, North America and the Middle east. While at Arup, he was involved in the Dongtan Eco-City urban work.

== Awards ==
Peter was elected to the Royal Academy of Engineering in 1996 and awarded the International Award of Merit in Structural Engineering by the International Association for Bridge and Structural Engineering in 1998. He was honoured with an OBE in the 1998 New Year Honours. He received an Honorary Doctor of Engineering degree from the University of Bristol, UK in 2008. In 2009, he was awarded the Sir Frank Whittle Medal by the Royal Academy of Engineering, UK. In the 2011 New Year Honours, Peter was elevated to CBE for services to civil engineering and the environment.
