= David E. Weston =

David E. Weston (19 January 1929 – 16 November 2001) was an English physicist, who worked at the Admiralty Research Establishment. During his early career he worked with A B Wood, and is best known for his contributions to underwater acoustics. He published more than 65 papers, including 32 in the Journal of the Acoustical Society of America, and was awarded the Rayleigh Medal by the Institute of Acoustics in 1970 and the Helmholtz-Rayleigh Interdisciplinary Silver Medal by the Acoustical Society of America in 1998. Weston was president of the UK Institute of Acoustics between 1982 and 1984.
