= Deep cement mixing =

Deep cement mixing (DCM) is a geotechnical engineering deep foundation ground improvement technique where a binder material, typically cement, is injected into the ground for ground stabilisation and land reclamation. The technique can also be used for containing contaminants and water cut-off. The resulting stabilised soil generally has a higher strength, lower permeability, lower compressibility and reduced liquefaction risk than the original soil. In land reclamation applications it is typically used when cheaper techniques such as dredging or draining cannot be applied because of environmental concerns due to contaminated soil that these two techniques would release. The expansion of the Hong Kong International Airport and Tokyo's Haneda Airport are examples of this.

Deep cement mixing was first developed in Japan where first field tests began in 1970. Originally granular quicklime was used as binder to stabilise the underlying soil, but soon better results were obtained using cement slurry and cement mortar. Until the end of the 1980s, DCM was used only in Japan and Scandinavia. Since then it has gained popularity also in the United States and Europe.

Deep cement mixing consists of using specially designed equipment, such as augers or mixing paddles, to mechanically mix the soil with an in-situ binder. The process simultaneously breaks up the soil without removing it, injects a binder at low pressure and thoroughly mixes the binder with the soil to form a reinforced block of soil after treatment. The soil to be improved is mixed mechanically in-situ either with a binder in a slurry form (wet method) or with a dry binder (dry method). As the soil is soft, the binder material mixes with the soil diffusing back into the excavated hole, so it is important to choose a binder material appropriate for the specific soil, although in the vast majority of cases, cement works well. As the cement-soil mix begins to harden, further cement is added on top of the growing column until the column reaches all the way up to the start. During this process further excavation of the diffusing soil may be required. The deep soil mixing columns are typically 0.6 to 2.4 m in diameter and depths of up to 50m can be reached depending on the nature of the ground conditions and the technique employed. Steel reinforcement can be inserted into fresh soil-mix to increase bending resistance of deep soil mixing columns used for excavation control. Finally the machinery is moved to the location of the next column where the process is repeated in order to form another column. Once fully hardened these columns are then able to bear much higher loads than the seabed (when using the technique to reclaim land) or the typically soft soil upon which one wants to build.
