= Roland Clift =

English chemical engineering professor

Roland Clift is an English chemical engineering professor known for his work and media contributions on the topic of sustainability.

== Career ==
Clift was born 19 November 1942 and studied Chemical Engineering at Trinity College, Cambridge, achieving first class honours in 1964. He received a PhD from McGill University in 1970 for work on particle-fluid interactions, and this was his main research area (at McGill and Cambridge then Surrey University) in subsequent years. He became Head of the Department of Chemical Engineering at Surrey in 1981.

His growing interest in the application of engineering principles to environmental issues led him in 1992 to establish the Centre for Environmental Strategy (CES) at the University of Surrey, a multidisciplinary group of engineers, scientists and social scientists. In this Centre he was an advocate of Clean Technology, Life Cycle Assessment and Sustainable Development. He is presently professor emeritus at the CES. He has made a number of criticisms of government policy with respect to energy and the environment. He moved to British Columbia in 2018. He is an adjunct professor at the University of British Columbia and the University of Victoria.

== Positions ==
Member, Royal Commission on Environmental Pollution (1996–2005). Visiting Professor in Environmental systems analysis at Chalmers University, Sweden. Expert Adviser to the House of Lords Science and Technology Committee enquiry into Energy Efficiency (2004–05). Member of the Science Advisory Council of the UK Department for Environment, Food and Rural Affairs (Defra) (2006–). Vice-President of Environmental Protection UK. President of the International Society for Industrial Ecology 2009–10. Visiting Professor at Chalmers University of Technology since 2000.

== Honours ==
He is a Fellow of the Institution of Chemical Engineers, the Royal Academy of Engineering and the Royal Society of Arts. In 1994 he was made an OBE for his initiative in promoting research in Clean Technology, and a CBE in 2006 for services to the environment. He received the Sir Frank Whittle Medal of the Royal Academy of Engineering for 2003, for 'an outstanding and sustained engineering achievement contributing to the well-being of the nation'. He received the 2007 Hanson Medal and the 2016 George E. Davis Medal of the Institution of Chemical Engineers.

== Selected publications ==
- Clift, R., Grace, J. R., and Weber, M. E., (1978) Bubbles, Drops and Particles Academic Press
- Davidson, J. F., Clift, R., and Harrison, D., (eds) (1985) Fluidization, 2nd ed Academic Press
- Clift, R., and Seville, J. P. K., (eds)(1993) Gas Cleaning at High Temperatures Blackie ISBN 0-7514-0178-1
- Clift, R. (1993) Journal of Cleaner Production, 1, 3–4, pp 155–159 "Life Cycle Assessment and Ecolabelling"
- Clift, R., & Wright, L., (2000) Technological Forecasting and Social Change, 65, 3, pp 281–295 "Relationships Between Environmental Impacts and Added Value Along the Supply Chain"
- Azapagic, A., Perdan, S., and Clift, R., (eds) (2004) Sustainable Development in Practice – case studies for engineers and scientists, John Wiley & Sons ISBN 0-470-85608-4
- Wilson, K.C., Addie, G. R., Sellgren, A. and Clift, R. (2006) Slurry Transport Using Centrifugal Pumps (3rd ed.). Springer Science + Business Media, Inc. New York.
- Clift, R. (2006) Energy, 32, pp. 262–268 "Climate Change and Energy Policy: The Importance of Sustainability Arguments"
- Clift, R. (2006) Chemical Engineering Science, 61, pp 4179–4187 "Sustainable development and its implications for chemical engineering"
- Clift, R. and Mulugetta, Y. (2007) The Chemical Engineer, October, pp. 24–26 "A Plea for Common Sense (and Biomass)"
