= Acoustic black hole effect =

Acoustic black hole effect is a physical phenomenon describing a large increase in damping of flexural vibrations in plates (as well as in beams) of variable thickness due to the combined action of a thin absorbing layer attached to one or both surfaces of a plate and of the so-called acoustic black hole geometry of a plate providing a gradual reduction in flexural wave velocity with propagation distance.

The acoustic black hole geometry can be materialised by creating a gradual reduction in local thickness of a plate with wave propagation distance to almost zero, i.e. by creating sharp elastic wedges. Such a gradual reduction should follow a power-law function of the propagation distance, with the power-law exponent being equal or larger than two. Consequently, the velocity of a propagating flexural wave, which is proportional to the square root from the local thickness of a plate, is reduced with the distance according to a power-law function too, but with the exponent being equal or larger than one. Under these conditions, the total accumulated phase of propagating flexural waves becomes very large (in the case of ideally sharp wedge it becomes infinite), and the described acoustic black hole effect, often referred to as simply 'acoustic black hole', provides almost 100% absorption (or almost 0% reflection) of the incident flexural waves even for nonideally sharp (truncated) elastic wedges and for very small pieces of attached absorbing layers.

The acoustic black hole effect can exist also for air-borne sound propagating in specially modified acoustic waveguides containing some added absorbing materials and providing a required reduction in acoustic wave velocity with propagation distance according to a power-law profile, with the power-law exponent being equal or larger than one.
