= Ground vibration boom =

Ground vibration boom is a phenomenon of very large increase in ground vibrations generated by high-speed railway trains travelling at speeds higher than the velocity of Rayleigh surface waves in the supporting ground.

== Technical background ==
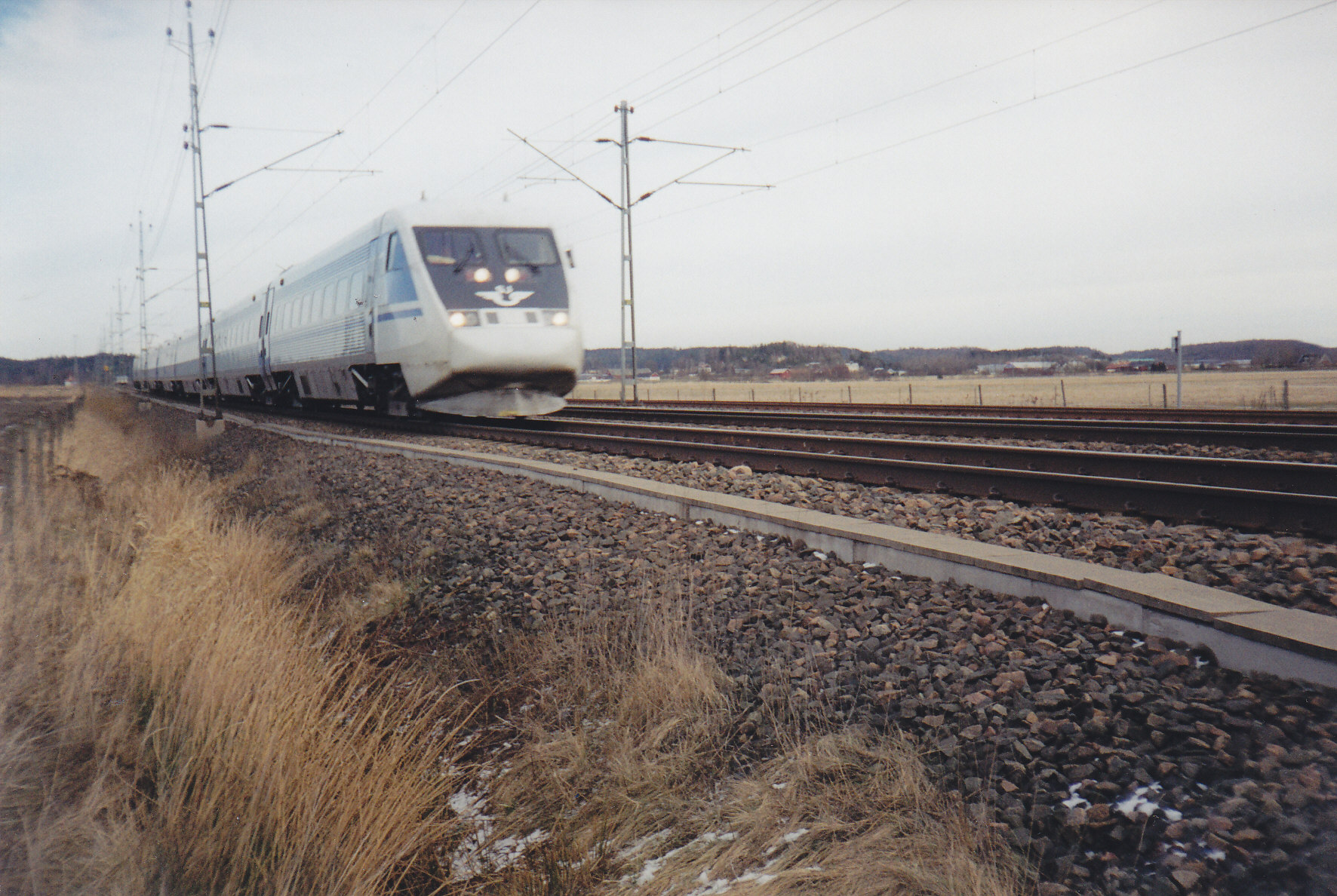
Swedish high-speed train X 2000 approaching Ledsgard.

This phenomenon, which is similar to a sonic boom from supersonic aircraft, was theoretically predicted in 1994. Its first experimental observation took place in 1997-1998 on the newly built high-speed railway line in Sweden (from Gothenburg to Malmo) for high-speed trains X 2000. At some locations along this line characterised by very soft ground (near Ledsgard) the Rayleigh wave velocity was as low as 45 metres per second (150 ft/s), and train speeds of only 165–170 kilometres per hour (103–106 mph) were sufficient to observe the effect. In particular, the increase in train speeds from 140 to 180 kilometres per hour (87 to 112 mph) was accompanied by about tenfold increase in generated ground vibration level, which agrees with the theory. It is now understood that, with the increase of operating train speeds, this phenomenon represents a major environmental problem associated with building new high-speed railway lines.

== Mitigation measures ==
The most efficient way to mitigate ground vibration boom is to reduce train speeds at locations where Rayleigh wave velocities in the ground are very low. If this is not desirable, e.g. for economic reasons, some mitigation measures can be applied, such as stiffening of railway embankments or building protective trenches and barriers between railways and residential or industrial buildings. Any mitigation measures would involve the specific ground investigation works along the route.

== See also ==
- High-speed trains
- Rayleigh waves
- Mach number
- Supershear earthquake
