= Herbert Haslegrave =

British engineer (1902–1999)

Herbert Leslie Haslegrave (1902–1999) was a British engineering academic who developed Loughborough Technical College into Loughborough University of Technology, and was its first Vice-Chancellor.

== Education ==
Haslegrave was born in Yorkshire in 1902 and went to Wakefield Grammar School. He continued studying part-time at Bradford Technical College whilst working as an engineering apprentice with the English Electric Company, and gained an external degree of the University of London with first class honours. He then obtained a Whitworth Senior Scholarship which enabled him to go to Trinity Hall, Cambridge where he gained first class honours in the Mechanical Sciences Tripos and several awards.

== Career ==
After a short period in industry he became a college lecturer, joining Wolverhampton & Staffordshire Technical College in 1931, then Bradford Technical College in 1932 and Loughborough College in 1935. He then held a series of posts as principal of colleges, respectively of St Helen's Technical College, Barnsley Technical College and Leicester College of Technology. In 1953 he became Principal of Loughborough College and developed it into a College of Advanced Technology in 1957 and to the UK's first Technical University, Loughborough University of Technology in 1966. He was its first Vice-Chancellor until his retirement in 1966. In 1972, Haslegrave was President of the Whitworth Society. He died in September 1999.

Academic offices
Preceded by first	Vice-Chancellor of Loughborough University; 1966–1967	Succeeded by Elfyn Richards
