= Steve Hallam =

British motor racing executive

Personal information
- Nationality: British
- Born: 12 July 1952 (age 73)

Sport
- Country: United Kingdom
- Sport: Formula One (1982-2008); NASCAR (2009-2011, 2016-); V8 Supercars (2012-2016)
- Team: Team Lotus (1982-1990); McLaren (1991-2008); Michael Waltrip Racing (2009-2011); Holden Racing Team (2012-2013); Tekno Autosports (2014-2015); Toyota Racing Development (2016-)

Steve Hallam (born 12 July 1952) is the manager of vehicle support and team engineering for Toyota Racing Development. From 2012 until 2016 he managed Australian V8 Supercars teams the Holden Racing Team and Tekno Autosports. Before this, he was executive vice president for competition for Michael Waltrip Racing, Director of Race Engineering for the McLaren Formula 1 team, and before that various positions with the team and Team Lotus.

== Career summary ==
- before 1975: graduated from Loughborough University
- 1975-1981: development engineer at Aston Martin
- 1981-1990: trainee, engineer, development engineer, race engineer at Team Lotus (F1). Race engineer for Nigel Mansell (1981-84), Ayrton Senna (1985-87), Nelson Piquet (1988-89) and Derek Warwick (1990)
- 1991-1996: race engineer at McLaren (F1) for Gerhard Berger (1991-92), Michael Andretti (1993) and Mika Häkkinen (1993-96)
- 1997: chief race engineer at McLaren (F1)
- 1998-2008: head of the race team at McLaren (F1)
- 2007: engineer on the pitwall for Fernando Alonso at McLaren (F1)
- 2009-2011: director of race engineering at Michael Waltrip Racing (NASCAR)
- 2012-2013: managing director for Holden Racing Team (V8 Supercars)
- 2014-2015: team manager at Tekno Autosports (V8 Supercars)
- 2016-: manager of vehicle support & team engineering at Toyota Racing Development, California
