= Loughborough University =

Public university in Loughborough, England

- Coat of arms
- Latin: Universitas Loughburiensis
- Motto: Latin: Veritate, Scientia, Labore
- Motto in English: By Truth, Wisdom, and Labour
- Type: Public
- Established: 1909 – Loughborough Technical Institute; 1966 – Loughborough University of Technology established by royal charter
- Academic affiliations: ACU; EUA; Midlands Innovation; UNITECH; Universities UK; Defence Universities Alliance
- Endowment: £2.66 million (2025)
- Budget: £386.2 million (2024/25)
- Chancellor: Sebastian Coe
- Vice-Chancellor: Nick Jennings
- Visitor: Paul Michell
- Academic staff: 1,745 (2024/25)
- Administrative staff: 2,240 (2024/25)
- Students: 18,955 (2024/25); 18,030 FTE (2024/25)
- Undergraduates: 15,490 (2024/25)
- Postgraduates: 3,470 (2024/25)
- Other students: 1,205 FE
- Location: Loughborough, England, United Kingdom; 52°46′6″N 1°13′43″W
- Campus: Suburban, single-site campus (523 acres)
Scarf
- Colours: African Violet
- Sporting affiliations: Wallace Group; BUCS
- Website: www.lboro.ac.uk

Loughborough University (abbreviated as Luff or Lboro for alumni) is a public research university in the market town of Loughborough, Leicestershire, England. It has been a university since 1966, but it dates back to 1909, when Loughborough Technical Institute was founded. In March 2013, the university announced it had bought the former broadcast centre at the Queen Elizabeth Olympic Park as a second campus. The annual income of the institution for 2024–25 was £386.2 million, of which £57.0 million was from research grants and contracts, with an expenditure of £379.5 million. In 2024, Loughborough ranked ninth nationally for undergraduate education.

== History ==
The university traces its roots back to 1909, when the Loughborough Technical Institute was founded in the town centre. There followed a period of rapid expansion led by principal Herbert Schofield, during which there was renaming to Loughborough College and development of the present campus.

In early years, efforts were made to mimic the environment of an Oxbridge college, e.g. students wore gowns to lectures, while maintaining a strong practical counterbalance to academic learning. During World War I, it served as an "instructional factory", training workers for the munitions industry.

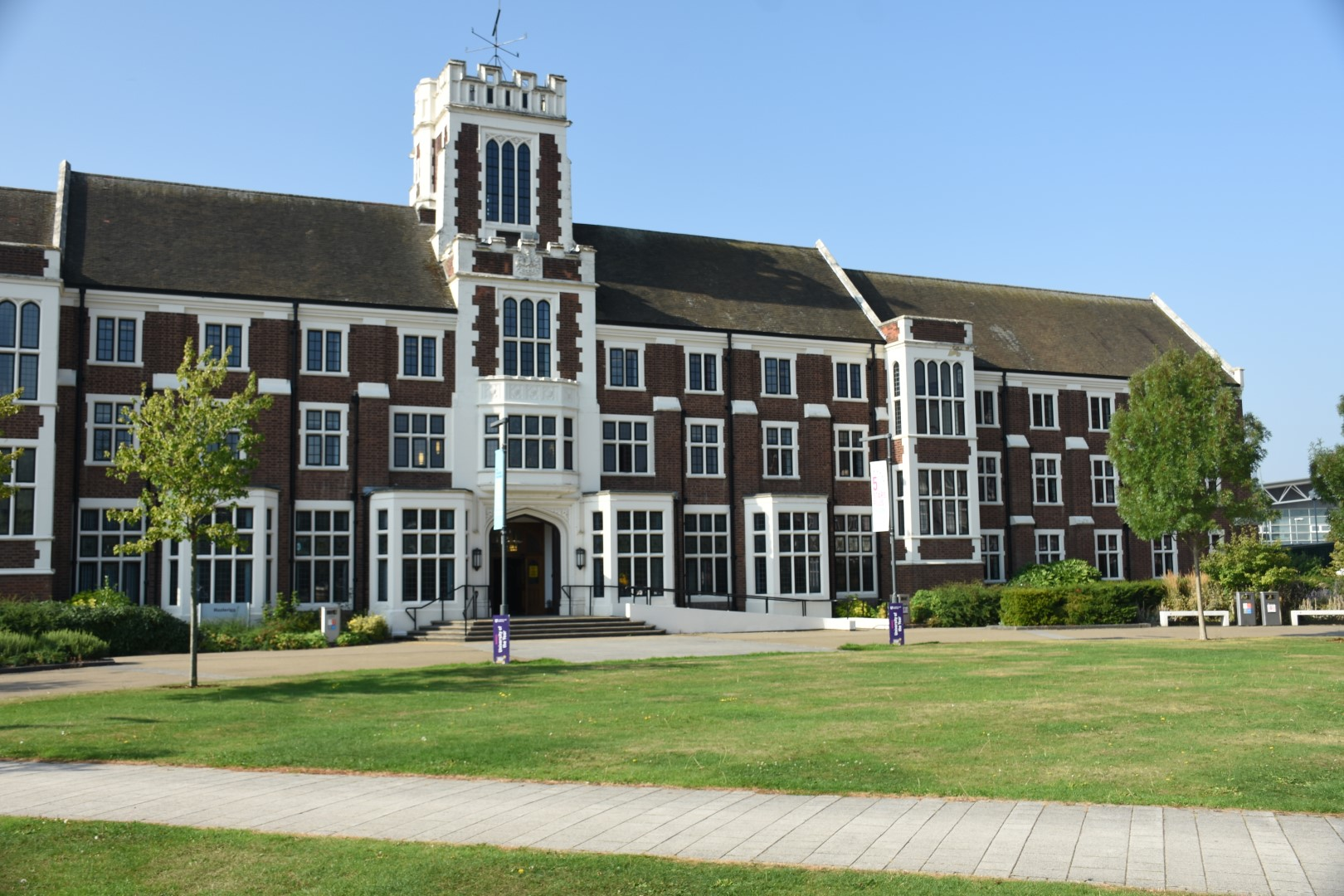
The Hazlerigg Building on campus

=== The Loughborough colleges ===
Following the war, the institute was divided into four separate colleges:

- Loughborough Training College (teacher training)
- Loughborough College of Art (art and design)
- Loughborough College of Further Education (technical and vocational)
- Loughborough College of Technology (technology and science)

The last would become the nucleus of the present university. Its rapid expansion from a small provincial college to the first British technical university was due largely to its principals, Herbert Schofield, who led it from 1915 to 1950, and Herbert Haslegrave, who oversaw its further expansion from 1953 to 1967 and steered its progress first to a College of Advanced Technology and then to a university in 1966. In 1977, the university broadened its range of studies by amalgamating with Loughborough College of Education (formerly the Training College). More recently, in August 1998, the university merged with Loughborough College of Art and Design (LCAD). Loughborough College remains a college of further education.

=== Influence of Herbert Schofield ===
Herbert Schofield became principal in 1915, and continued to lead the College of Technology until 1950. Under his guidance, the college changed almost beyond recognition. He bought the estate of Burleigh Hall on the western outskirts of the town, which became the nucleus of the present 438-acre (177-hectare) campus. He oversaw the building of the original Hazlerigg and Rutland halls of residence, which are now home to the university's administration and the vice-chancellor's offices.

=== School of Physical Education ===
Frederick Annesley Michael Webster (27 June 1886 - 11 April 1949), of Bradwell Juxta Coggeshall in north-west Essex, with Evelyn Montague, an athlete who competed in the much-heralded 1924 Summer Olympics, started an AAA summer school at Loughborough, from August 18, 1934. It was the first summer school for athletics in the UK. Tutors on the course included the sprinter Harold Abrahams and javelin thrower Jock Dalrymple. At the summer school on August 12, 1938, Lord Burghley attended, with Austrian coach Franz Stampfl, giving a hurdling display.

The first Loughborough College Stadium was opened on the afternoon of Tuesday June 1, 1937, by Clarence Bruce, 3rd Baron Aberdare, the chairman of the National Advisory Council for Physical Education, with Lt-Col R E Martin, the chairman of Leicestershire County Council. The stadium was the first in the UK for all track and field events, built on eight acres, and built by students, who were paid with only a cup of tea. A new School of Athletics, Games and Physical Education would begin later in September 1937. It was founded by F.A.M. Webster; his son, Richard Webster, had competed in the 1936 Berlin Olympics, coming sixth in the pole vault.

=== From college to university ===
An experienced educationist, Herbert Haslegrave took over as college principal in 1953. By increasing breadth and raising standards, he gained the institution the status of Colleges of Advanced Technology in 1958. He persuaded the Department of Education to buy further land and began a building programme.

In 1963, the Robbins Report on higher education recommended that all colleges of advanced technology be given university status. Loughborough College of Technology was granted a Royal Charter on 19 April 1966, and became Loughborough University of Technology (LUT), with Haslegrave as its first vice-chancellor. It gradually remodelled itself in the image of the plate glass universities of the period, which had also been created under Robbins.

=== Later history ===
In 1977, Loughborough Training College (now Loughborough College of Education) was absorbed into the university. In 1996, the university dropped the "of Technology" from its title, becoming Loughborough University. The Arts College was also amalgamated with the university in 1998. These additions have shifted the technological leaning of the institution, causing it to function more as a traditional university, with a combination of humanities, arts and sciences.

The shortened name "Lboro", "Lufbra" or "Luff" is commonly used by the students' union, the alumni association and others.

== Campus ==
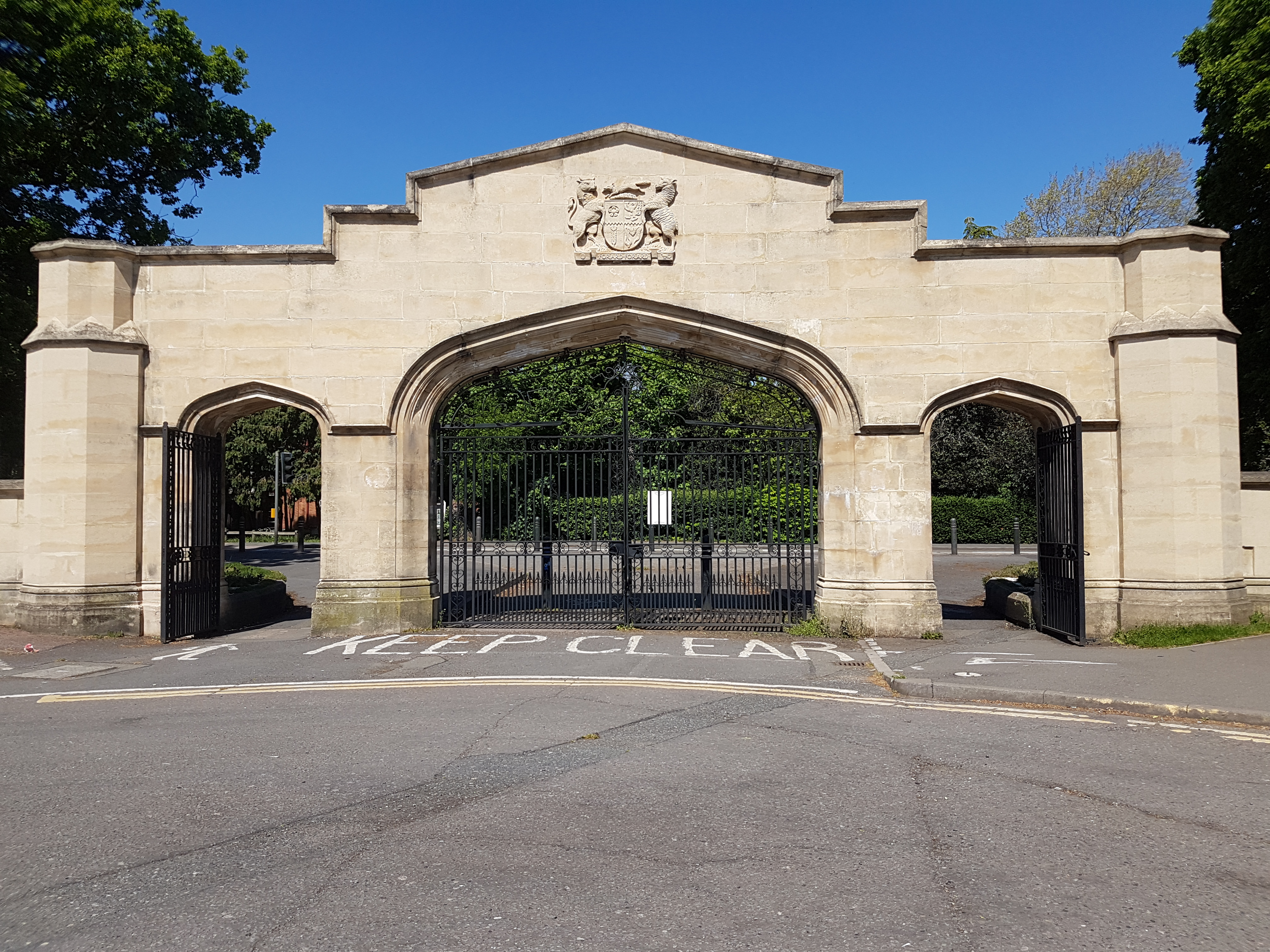
The Bastard Gates, named after William Bastard, the Former Chairman of Governors

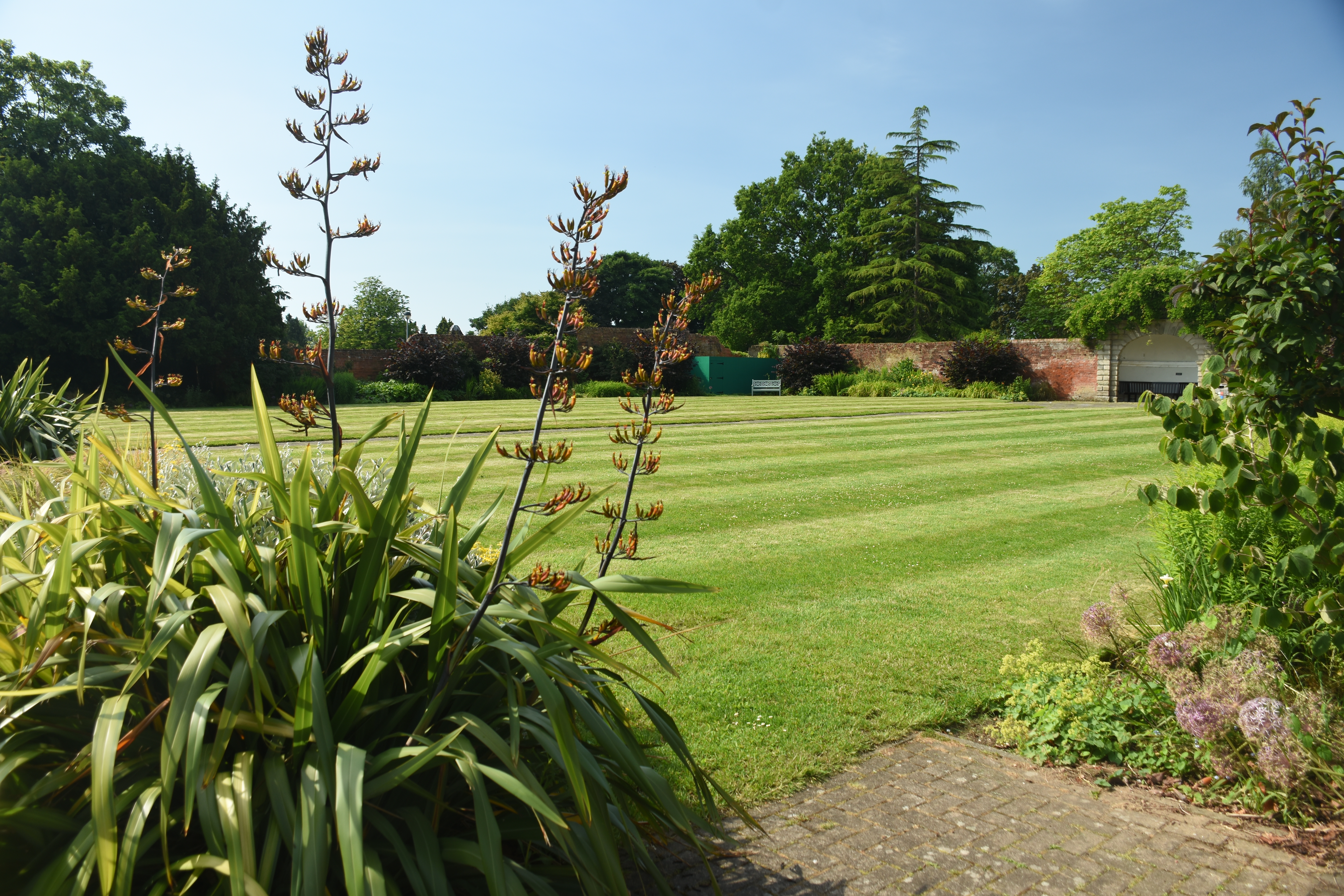
The Walled Garden in June 2024

The university's main campus is in the town of Loughborough. That campus (once the estate of Burleigh Hall) covers an area of 523 acres, and includes academic departments, 17 halls of residence, the Students' Union, two gyms, gardens and playing fields.

Of particular interest are The Walled Garden, with its Garden of Remembrance, the Hazlerigg-Rutland Hall fountain-courtyard, The Old Cottage and the Bastard Gates donated by and named after William Bastard, the Chairman of College Governors, which form the official entrance to Rutland Hall.

In the central quadrangle of the campus stands a famous cedar tree of veteran status, with a girth of 5.12 m. The cedar has often appeared as a symbol for the university and it was heavy snowfall in December 1990 that led to the collapse of the upper canopy which gave the tree its distinctive shape.

=== Library ===
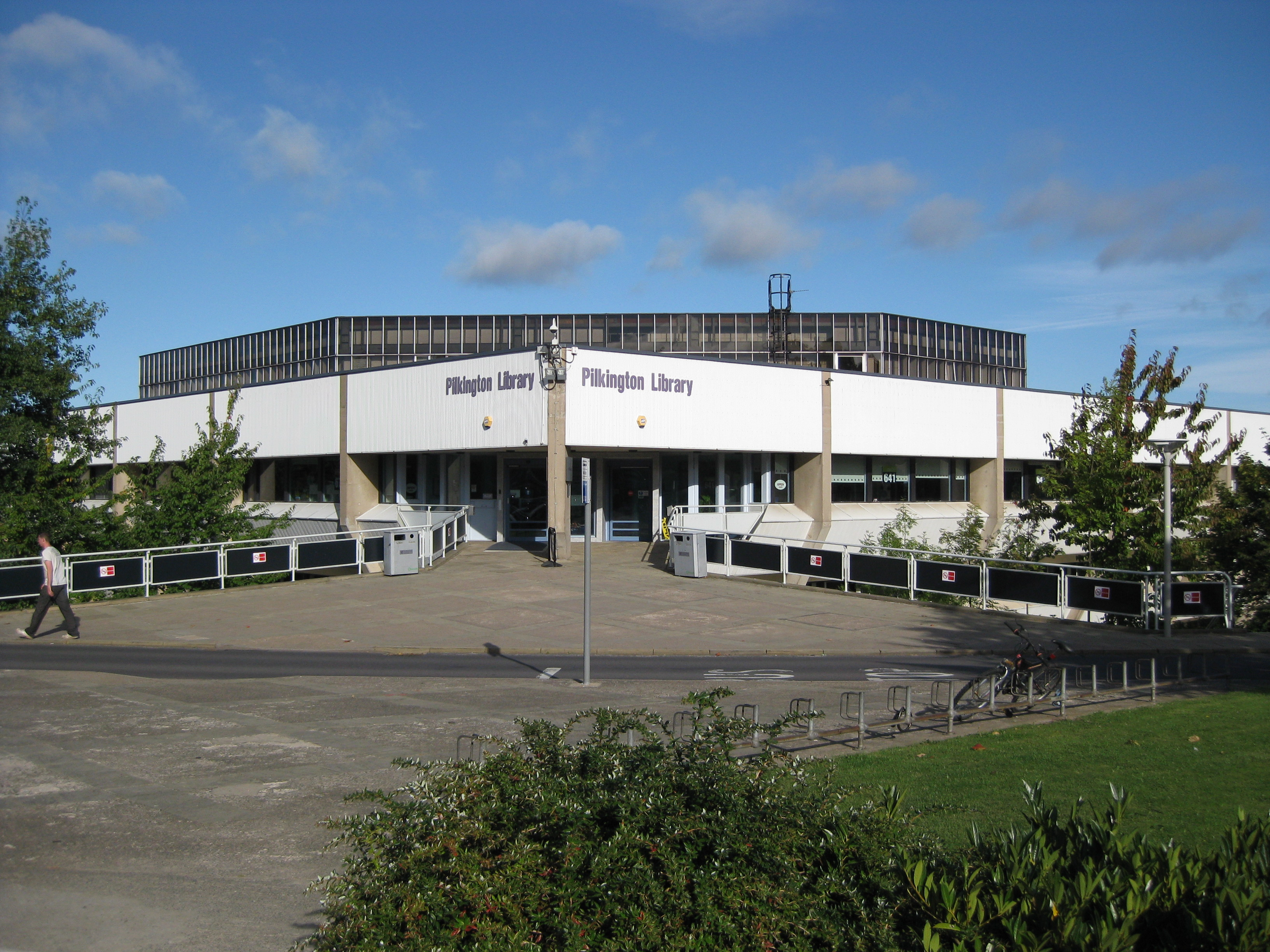
Pilkington Library

The Pilkington Library opened in 1980. It covers 98,608 sq. ft. (9,161 square metres) over four floors with 1375 study places – up from 780 prior to the renovation in late 2013. The library has a history of undertaking research in the field of library and information work.

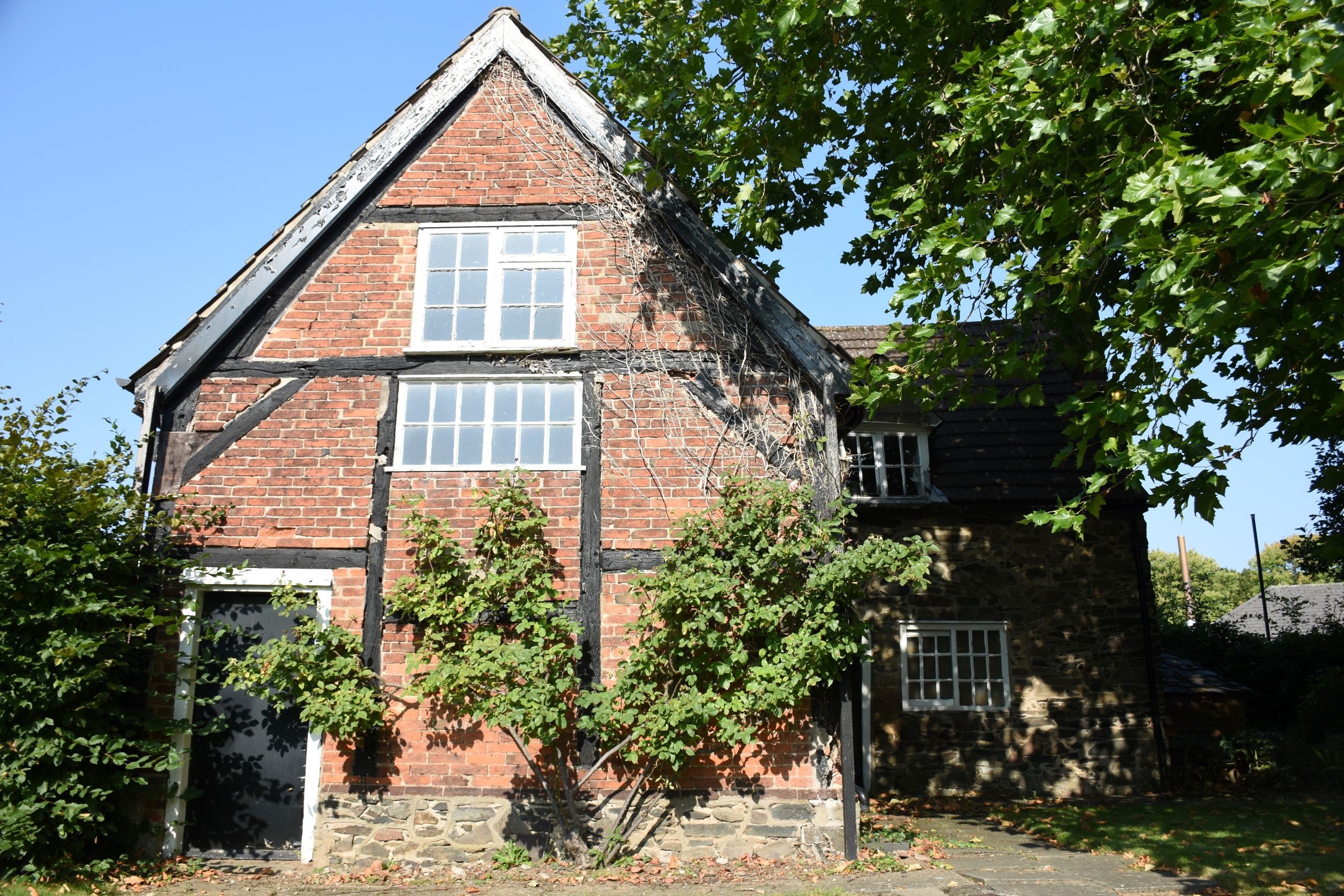
'The Old Cottage' on campus, reputed to be Loughborough's oldest complete dwelling.

=== Holywell Park Conference Centre ===
Holywell Park Conference Centre is a conference and meeting venue located on campus. It was used as the kitting out location for Team GB prior to the 2012 Summer Olympics.

=== University Stadium ===
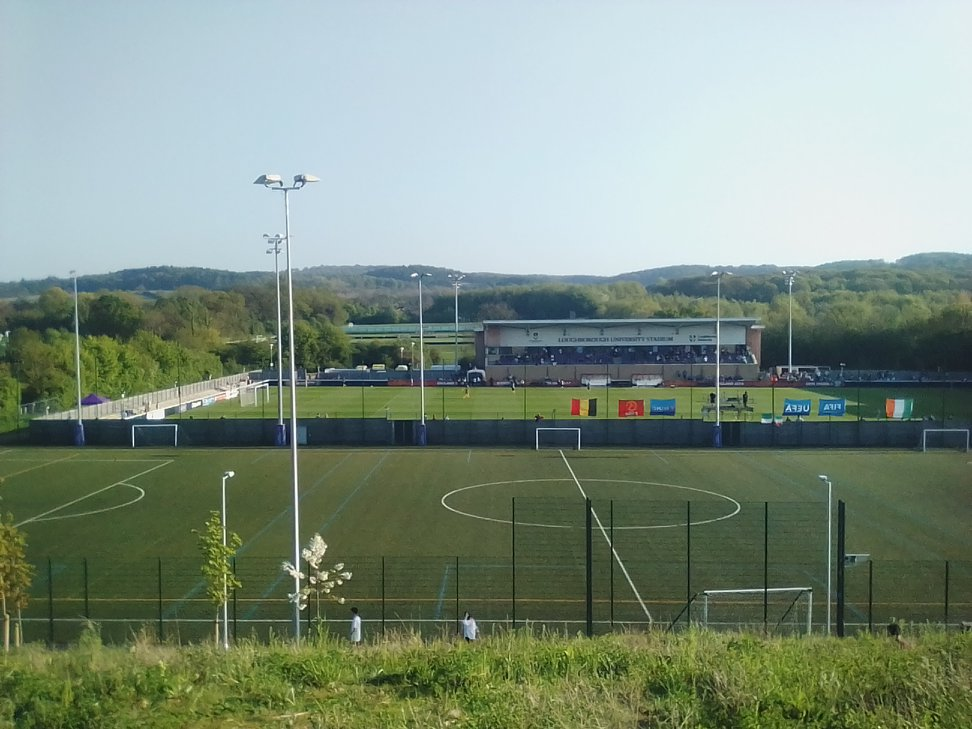
The University Stadium in 2018

The £4 million stadium for the university's rugby and football first teams was opened in 2012 and has a capacity of 3,000. It is home to Loughborough University FC, which is one of the few university sides to play in the English football league system, currently competing in the Northern Premier League. The stadium includes a digital scoreboard, conference facilities and 14 changing rooms. In 2018 it hosted four matches in the group stages of the European Under-17 Championships.

== Organisation ==
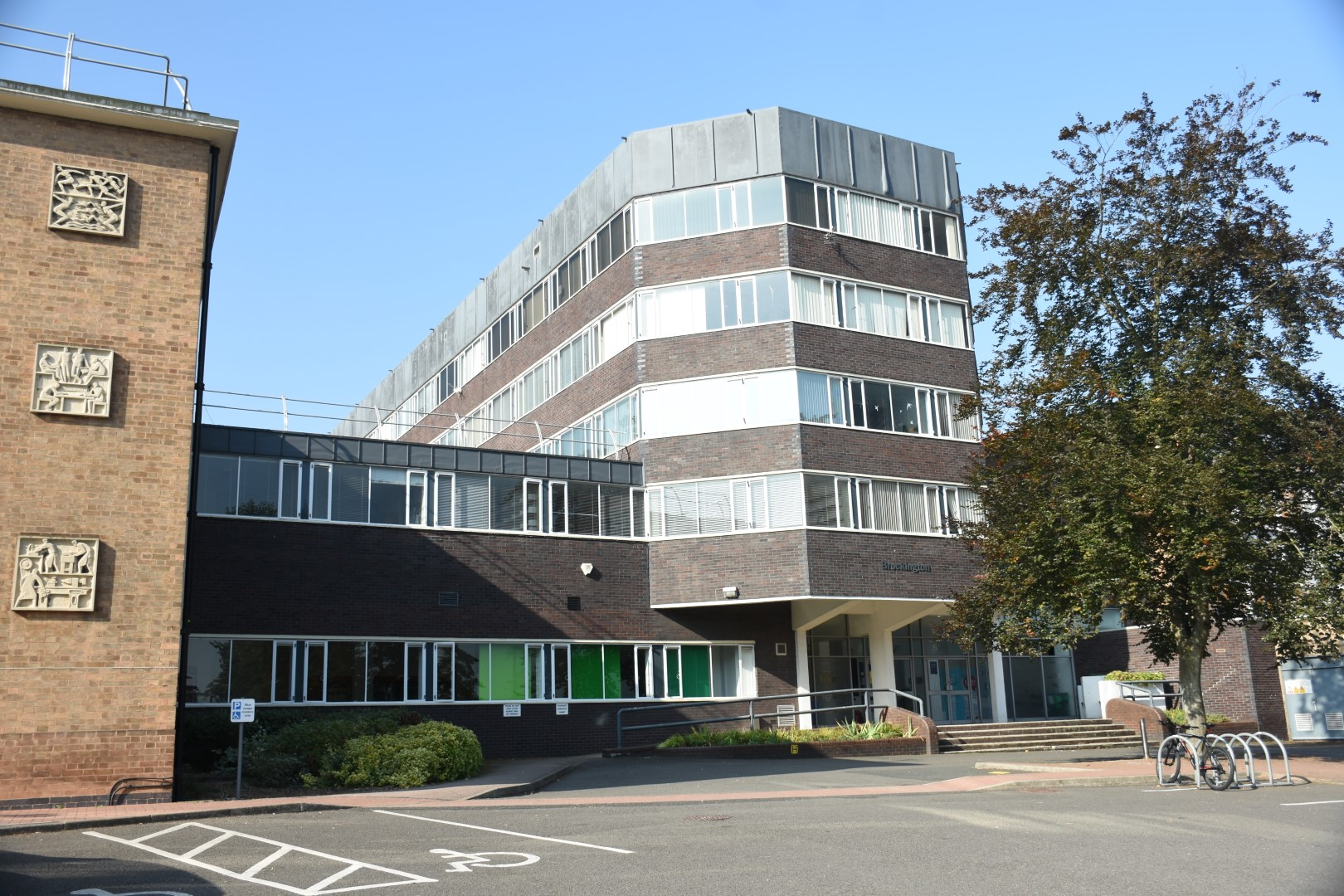
The Brockington Building is the home of the School of Social Sciences and Humanities

Loughborough University is headed by a vice-chancellor and is organised into nine schools:

- School of Aeronautical, Automotive, Chemical and Materials Engineering (comprising the three departments of Aeronautical and Automotive Engineering, Chemical Engineering, and Materials)
- School of Architecture, Building and Civil Engineering
- Loughborough Business School
- School of Design and Creative Arts
- Wolfson School of Mechanical, Electrical and Manufacturing Engineering
- School of Science (comprising the five departments of Chemistry, Computer Science, Mathematical Sciences, Mathematics Education and Physics)
- School of Social Sciences and Humanities (comprising the five divisions of Communication and Media; Criminology, Sociology and Social Policy; English; Geography and Environment; International Relations, Politics and History)
- School of Sport, Exercise and Health Sciences
- Loughborough University London (comprising the Institute for Design Innovation, Institute for Digital Technologies, Institute for Diplomacy and International Governance, Institute for Innovation and Entrepreneurship, Institute for International Management, Institute for Media and Creative Industries, Institute for Sport Business)

Each of the 9 schools has a senior leadership team consisting of deans, associate deans for education and research, and operations managers. The University Executive Board is made up of the vice-chancellor, deputy vice-chancellor, chief operating officer, chief finance officer, the pro vice-chancellors for equity, diversity and inclusion, education and research, director of organisational development and the 9 deans.

In May 2022, the university launched a new strategy called "Creating Better Futures. Together", which sets out to guide Loughborough's activities and development over the next decade.

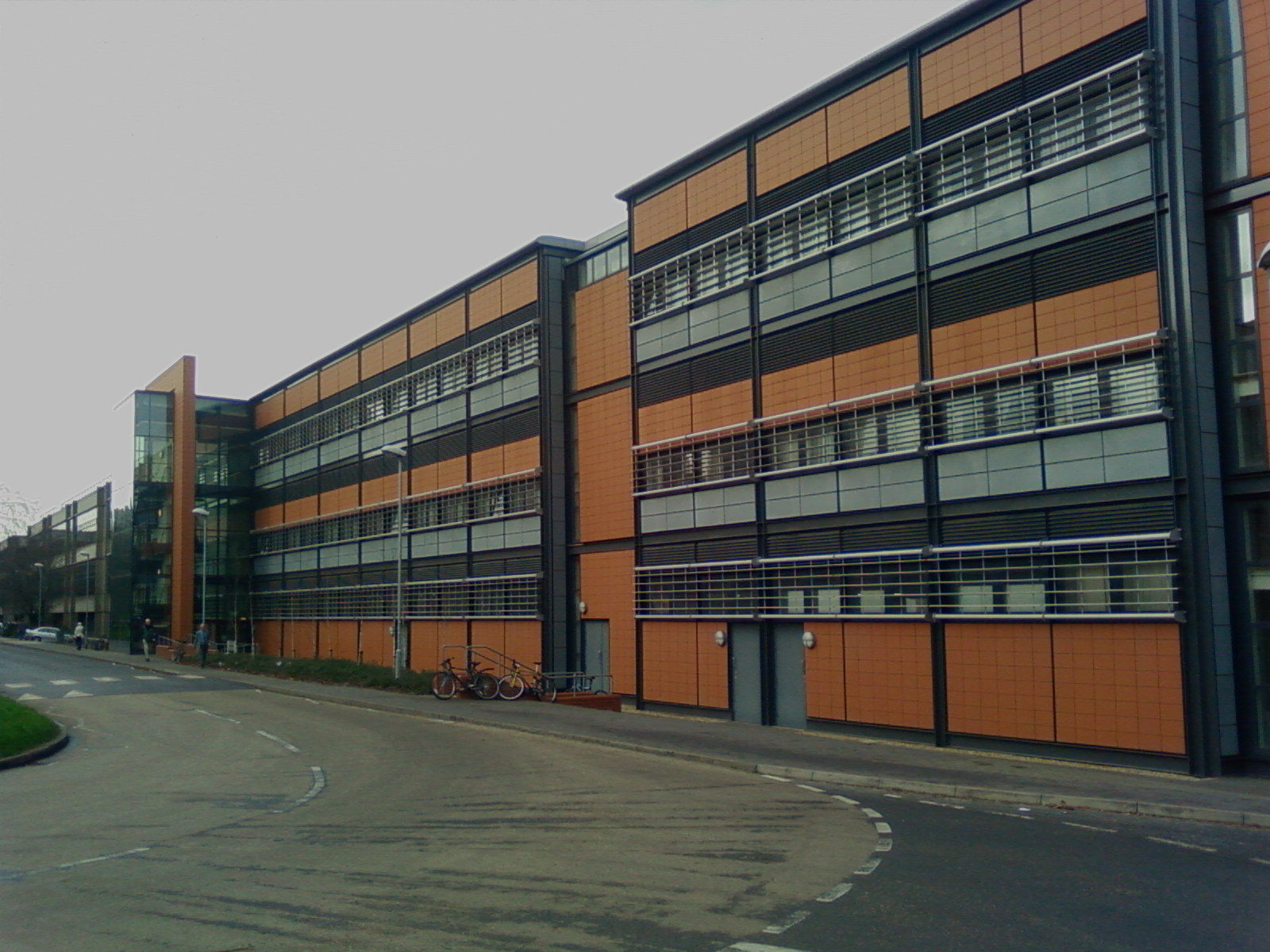
Wolfson School of Mechanical, Electrical and Manufacturing Engineering

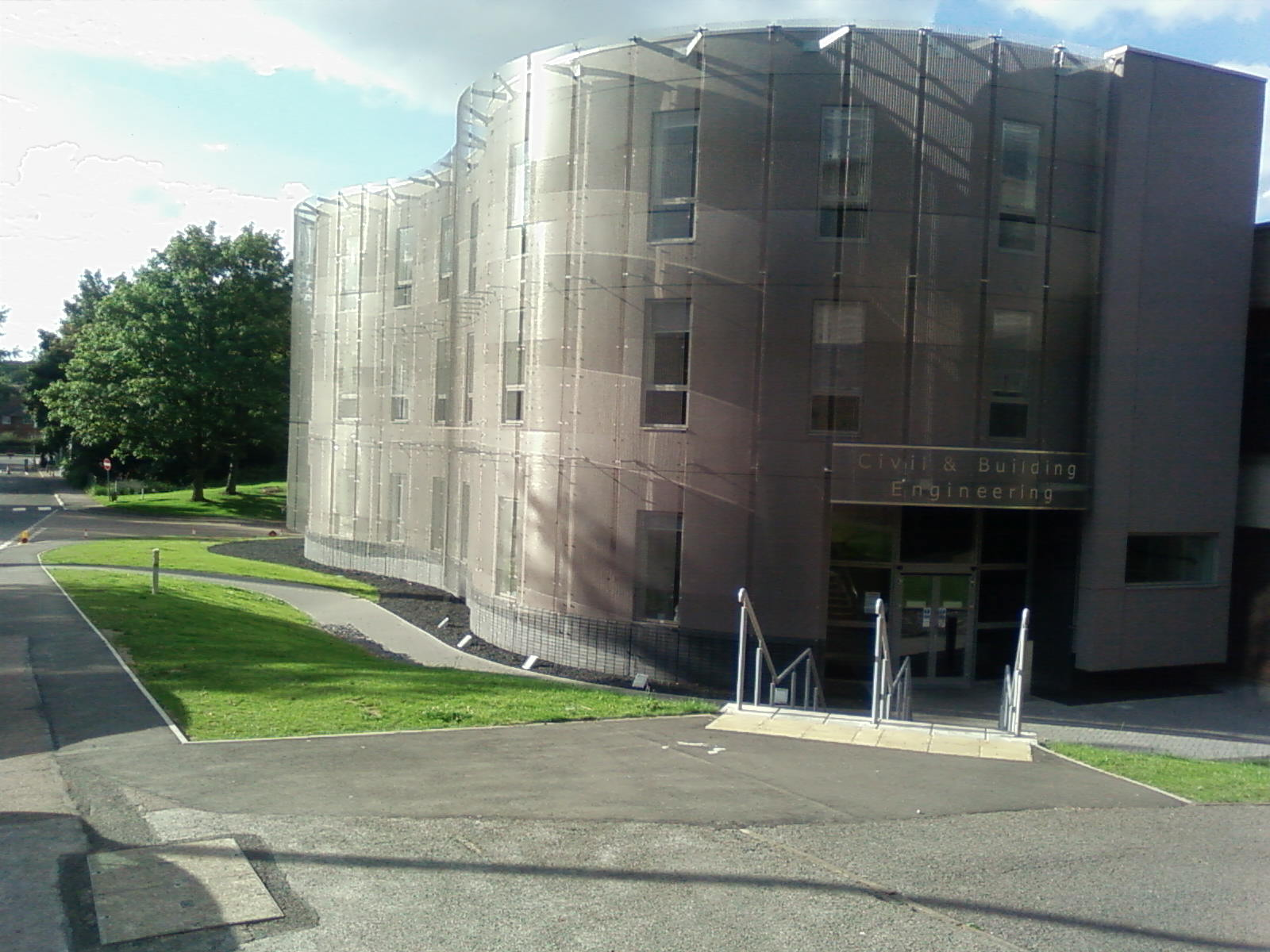
School of Architecture, Building and Civil Engineering

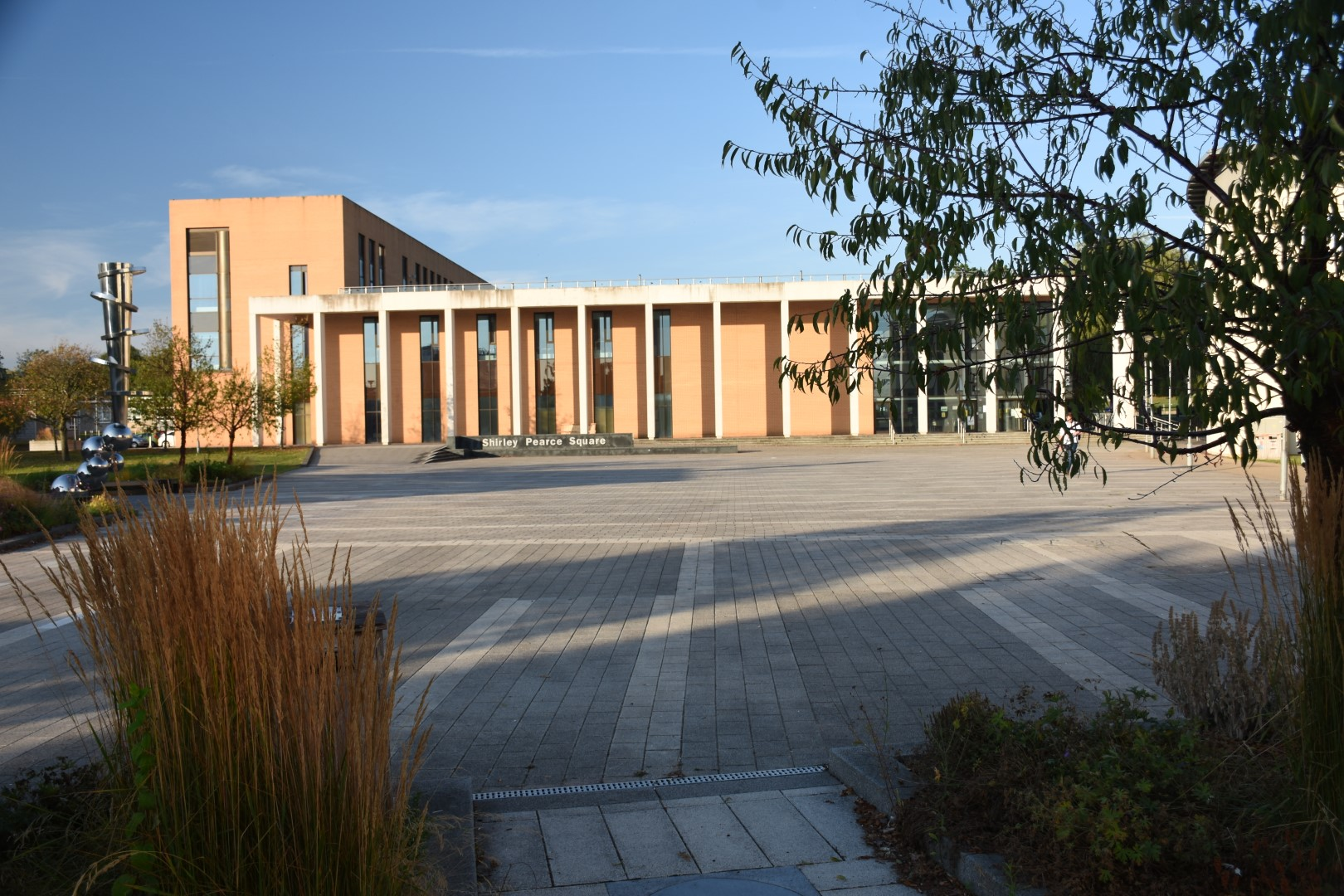
The East Midlands hub of the National Centre for Sport and Exercise Medicine, based at Loughborough University

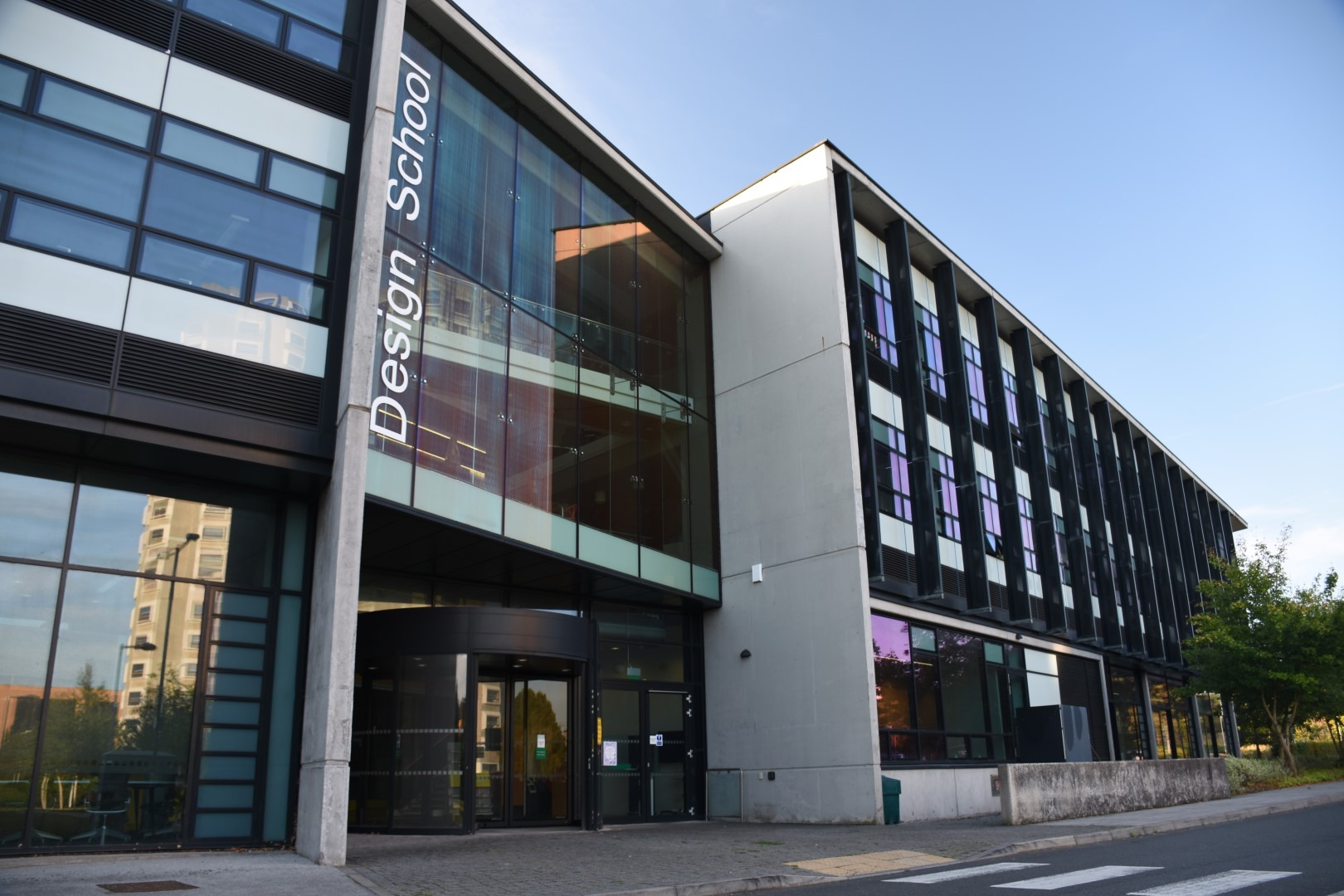
Loughborough Design School building

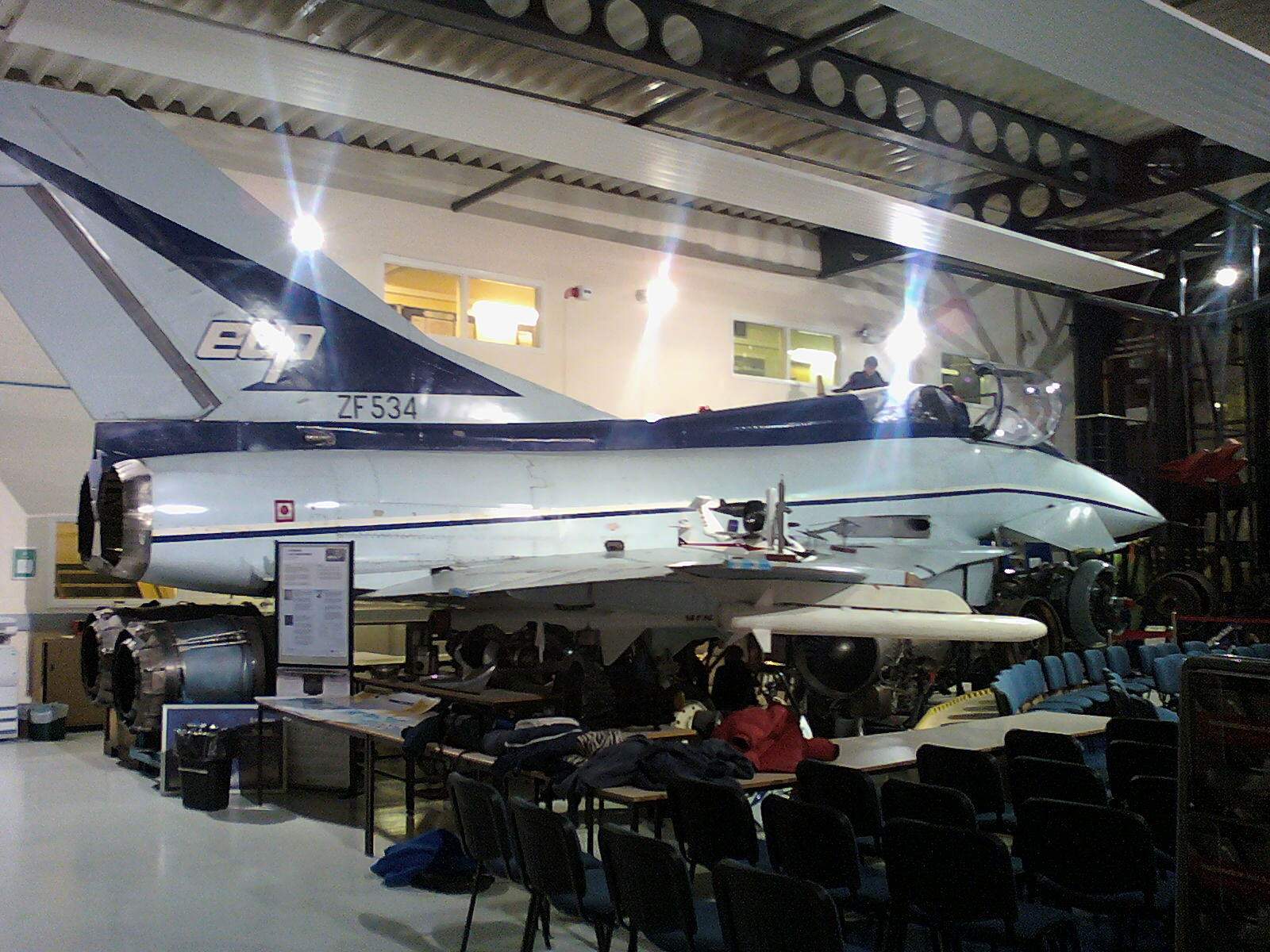
British Aerospace EAP at the Department of Aeronautical and Automotive Engineering

=== Traditions ===
The official colour of the university is African violet. The coat of arms incorporates several symbols relevant to the history of the Loughborough area, including Offa of Mercia's cross (a symbol of the ancient kingdom of Mercia, within whose borders the town now stands) and the peafowl from the arms of the Dukes of Rutland. The motto of the university is veritate scientia labore ("with truth, wisdom and labour", or, alternatively, "with truth, knowledge and work", depending on the translation).

The university has a strong tradition in both engineering and sport. From its strong engineering and technical background it has now expanded, becoming a centre of excellence in the field of sports and sports science. It has graduated a number of world-class athletes including Paula Radcliffe and Lord Coe. In keeping with this tradition, Loughborough students have won the British Universities & Colleges Sport Association (BUCS) championship every year for four decades. The university is the home of the England and Wales Cricket Board's National Academy, opened in November 2003.

The university (and Loughborough College before it) once had a "mascot" consisting of an oversized knight's helmet with a lowered visor, commonly called "Thor". This was constructed in 1958 by students of Hazlerigg-Rutland hall in the college welding shop. In the late 1980s Thor was displayed in the Students' Union foyer, but it has since gone missing.

== Academic profile ==
The university has 20 academic departments and over 100 research groups, institutes and centres currently divided between nine schools. Previously the departments and research institutes had been split between three faculties: Science, Engineering and Social Science & Humanities.

It has 18,295 students; 13,885 of whom are undergraduates and 4,410 are pursuing postgraduate courses and/or research (based on 2024/25 figures). Its current Chancellor is Lord Sebastian Coe. Loughborough's vice-chancellor and president is Nick Jennings, who took up the post in October 2021 following the departure of Robert Allison.

The university has won seven Queen's Anniversary Prizes for Higher and Further Education for working with the aeronautical and automotive industries (1994); support for developing countries (1998); for its role in developing applications of modern optics and laser technologies (2000); for its role in sports research, education and development (2002); for its role in social policy in recognition of its work in evaluating and helping develop social policy-related programmes, such as those for cared for children, social security policy, crime prevention, education initiatives and young carers (2005); for recognition of its vehicle, road and driver safety research (2007); and for its impact through research and skills development in High Value Manufacturing to create economic growth (2013).

The university has the largest sports scholarship programme in the UK, with over 250 international athletes studying and training.

=== Admissions ===
UCAS Admission Statistics
	2025	2024	2023	2022	2021
Applications (Note: Main scheme applications, International and UK)	33,755	31,625	31,515	30,835	34,255
Accepted	5,030	4,980	4,295	4,530	4,980
Applications/Accepted Ratio	6.7	6.4	7.3	6.8	6.9
Overall Offer Rate (%)	72.0	71.7	68.6	67.6	74.7
↳ UK only (%) (Note: UK domiciled applicants)	72.4	72.4	69.1	67.5	74.5
Average Entry Tariff	—N/a	—N/a	148	157	160
↳ Top three exams (Note: The maximum tariff score for three exams is 168: the equivalent of A*A*A* at A-Level, 777 at HL for the IB Diploma Programme, or AAA at Advanced Higher)	—N/a	—N/a	143.9	147.5	150.2

HESA Student Body Composition (2024/25)
Domicile and Ethnicity	Total
British White (Note: Not be confused solely with White British)	58%
British Ethnic Minorities (Note: Includes those who indicate that they identify as Asian, Black, Mixed Heritage, Arab or any other ethnicity except White.)	23%
International EU	2%
International Non-EU	16%
Undergraduate Widening Participation Indicators
Female	40%
Independent School	19%
Low Participation Areas (Note: Calculated from the Polar4 measure, using Quintile1, in England and Wales. Calculated from the Scottish Index of Multiple Deprivation (SIMD) measure, using SIMD20, in Scotland.)	6%

In the 2024/25 academic year, the student body consisted of 18,955 students, composed of 15,490 undergraduates and 3,470 postgraduate students. The university is consistently designated as a 'high-tariff' institution by the Department for Education, with the average undergraduate entrant to the university in recent years amassing between 144–150 UCAS Tariff points in their top three pre-university qualifications – the equivalent of AAA to A*AA at A-Level. Based on 2022/23 HESA entry standards data published in domestic league tables, which include a broad range of qualifications beyond the top three exam grades, the average student at Loughborough University achieved 157 points.

According to the 2017 Times and Sunday Times Good University Guide, approximately 17% of Loughborough's undergraduates come from independent schools. In the 2016–17 academic year, the university had a domicile breakdown of 79:5:16 of UK:EU:non-EU students respectively with a female to male ratio of 39:61.

=== Rankings and reputation ===
Rankings
National rankings
- Complete (2027): 8
- Guardian (2027): 9
- Times / Sunday Times (2027): 13

Global rankings
- ARWU (2026): 601–700
- QS (2027): 203
- THE (2026): 301–350

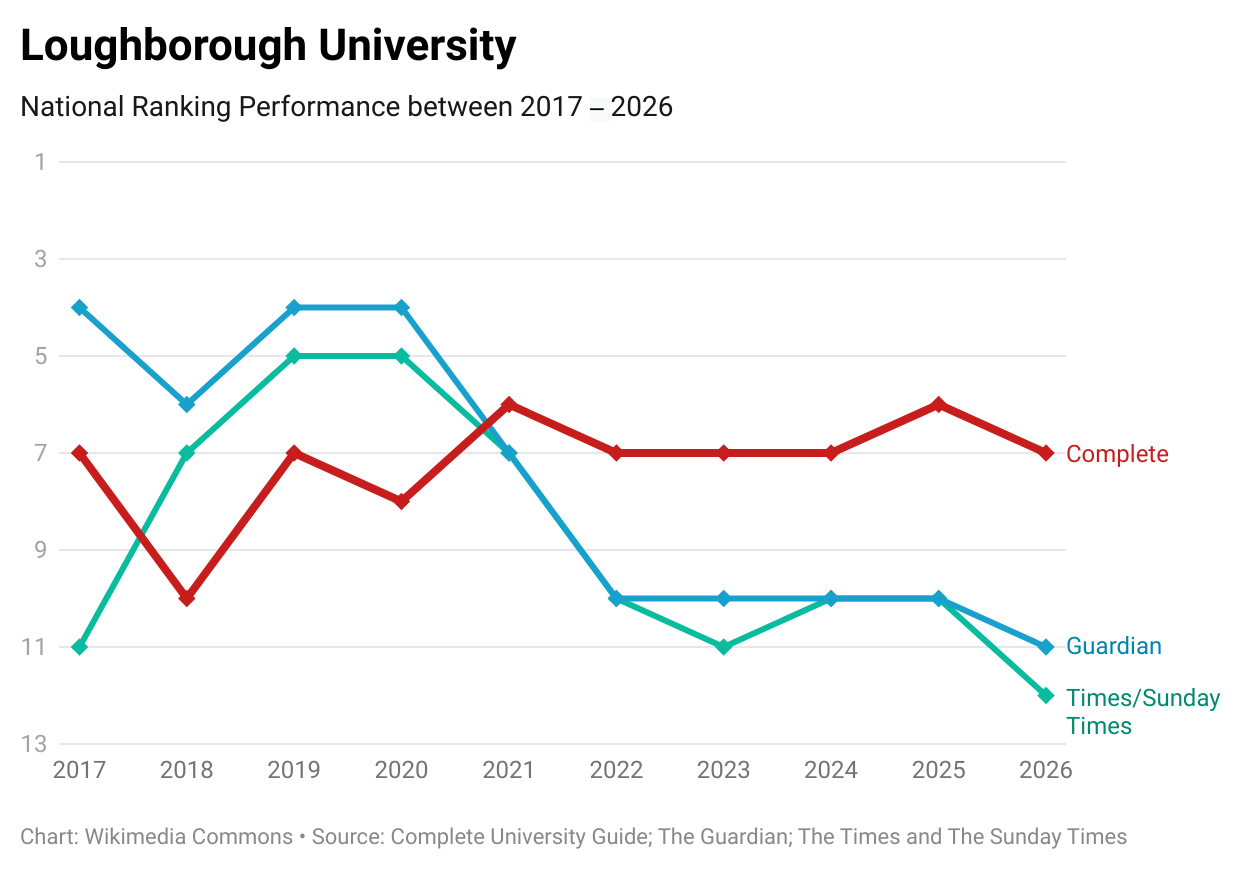
Loughborough University's national league table performance over the past ten years

Loughborough was named University of the Year 2019 in The Times and Sunday Times University Good University Guide. Loughborough is one of only four universities, along with Bath, Oxford and St Andrews, to have won the title twice. Loughborough also moved up to 5th overall in the Good University Guide. Loughborough was also given the title of university of the year at the Whatuni Student Choice Awards 2018.

In the 2020 ranking exercise by Times Higher Education, Loughborough was ranked 59th in the world for the Best 'Golden Age' Universities, defined as those universities established for over 50 years, but less than 80 years.

In 2018 Loughborough was named best in the UK for student experience in the Times Higher Education Student Experience Survey for the fifth time since 2009.

Loughborough kept its position as the best university in the world to study sports-related subjects in the global 2018 QS higher education league table.

=== Sports ===
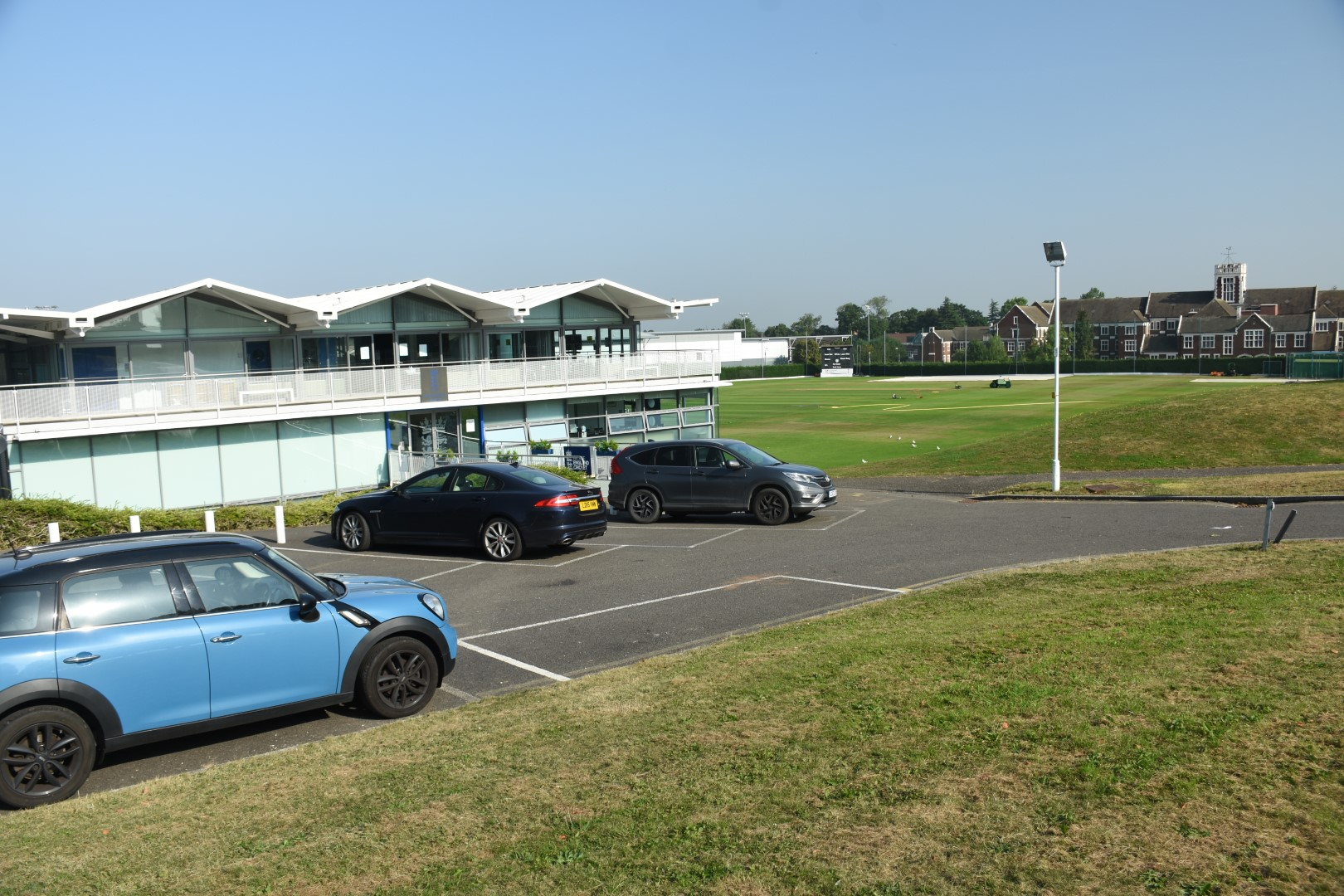
Loughborough University Cricket Centre, home to the National Cricket Performance Centre for the England and Wales Cricket Board (ECB)

Loughborough is renowned in the UK for its sports provisions.

Loughborough University has been ranked number 1 in the world for sport-related subjects for in the QS World University Rankings by Subject since 2017.

As of the 2024 league, Loughborough is ranked first in the British Universities and Colleges Sport league table.

Loughborough Sport is the brand identity for the sport-related activities and facilities at the university. The university is host to a number of sports governing bodies including England cricket, British swimming, British Triathlon, England Netball, British athletics and British weight lifting.

Facilities include an indoor athletics centre and outdoor stadium, sports halls and all-weather pitches, a 50-metre swimming pool, squash, badminton and netball courts, an indoor tennis centre and outdoor courts, and two gyms.

In March 2023, the university opened an extension to its Powerbase gym. The new facility spans a combined 3,200 m^{2} and is home to the University's Boxing Centre of Excellence and the Athletic Union Boxing club.

The ECB National Academy which is also known as the National Cricket Performance Centre has been based at Loughborough since 2003 and provides indoor and outdoor training facilities for cricketers.

Loughborough was chosen by the British Olympic Association as the training base and official Preparation Camp for Team GB in the run-up to the London 2012 Games. Students and graduates of Loughborough won four bronze medals and six Paralympic medals (one gold, three silver and two bronze) in the 2012 Summer Olympics.

At the 2014 Commonwealth Games in Glasgow, over 120 athletes from Loughborough represented 8 teams, across 10 sports. In total, 35 medals were won by athletes with Loughborough connections; 13 bronze, 13 silver and nine gold medals. If Loughborough was a country, the university would have finished 11th on the medal table at the 2014 Games.

In 2016 over 80 students, graduates and Loughborough-linked athletes travelled to Rio to participate in both the Olympic and Paralympic Games. In the Olympic competition their athletes secured 12 medals, including 5 golds. Loughborough-linked coaches also played a key role in the Games, with alumni guiding Team GB, Canada and Fiji to gold medals. During the Paralympic competition Loughborough-linked athletes secured a further 22 medals.

Loughborough was connected to more than 100 athletes at the 2020 Olympic and Paralympic Games in Tokyo. At the Paralympic Games, 21 medals – six gold, six silver and nine bronze – were won by athletes with Loughborough connections.

SportPark, based at the university provides a home for national sporting bodies including Youth Sport Trust, British Swimming and several other national governing bodies.

=== Research centres and groups ===
Loughborough has a wide range of research centres and institutes, including:

- Centre for Renewable Energy Systems Technology
- Centre for Research in Communication and Culture
- Centre for Research in Social Policy
- Centre for Mathematical Cognition
- National Centre for Combustion and Aerothermal Technology
- Sport Technology Institute
- Centre for Sustainable Transitions: Energy, Environment and Resilience

In 2023, The Times Higher Education Impact Rankings, which assess universities against the United Nations' Sustainable Development Goals, placed Loughborough first in the UK and 15th globally for affordable and clean energy (SDG 7).

The Centre for Renewable Energy Systems Technology, or CREST, runs a masters programme in renewable energy. The Centre for Research in Social Policy is an independent research centre based within the Department of Social Sciences. It is responsible for calculating the Minimum Income Standard in the United Kingdom for the Joseph Rowntree Foundation.

The Department of Politics, History and International Relations, or PHIR, is home to researchers in European politics and international relations. It evolved from the Department of European Studies, which was established in 1972.

In 2003, the department took the decision to invest in the study of Politics and International Relations and began to offer undergraduate degrees in International Relations. It was after this that the department had a change of name and became the Department of Politics, International Relations and European Studies (PIRES). PIRES was declared a Jean Monnet Centre of Excellence by the European Commission. Notable alumni of PHIR include Paula Radcliffe, Tanni Grey-Thompson and James Gibson. Academics include Ruth Kinna, Professor of Political Theory.

== Student life ==
=== Students' Union ===
The Union building sits in the north-eastern corner of the campus, and offers a range of facilities for clubs and societies, retail, entertainment and other activities. The Union has five rooms, each with its own theme. Loughborough Students' Union (LSU), was awarded the International Experience Award 2011 by the National Union of Students (NUS).

As well as representing the student body through Union Council and offering academic support through Loughborough Students' Voice, the Union has five main sections for students: the athletic union offering 56 different sporting clubs, the Societies Federation consisting of over 80 societies, Action as the volunteering section offering a range of opportunities for students, along with 45 regular projects working with young people, the elderly, special needs, the homeless or the environment.

Loughborough has a media centre, which offers the opportunity to make TV shows with LSUTV, have your own radio show with LCR, write for the student magazine Label or improve your photography with Lens. The School of the Arts, English and Drama runs The Lamplight Press, the UK's first student-led publishing company.

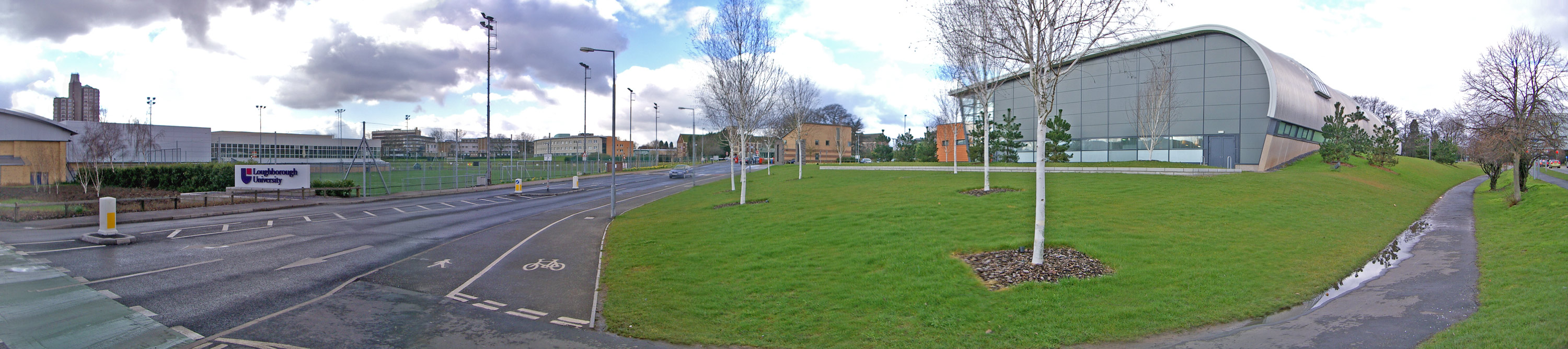
Loughborough University, Epinal Way entrance.

=== Student halls ===
As of 2025, there are a total of 16 halls of residence, many of which are named after famous scientists and engineers. The halls are as follows:

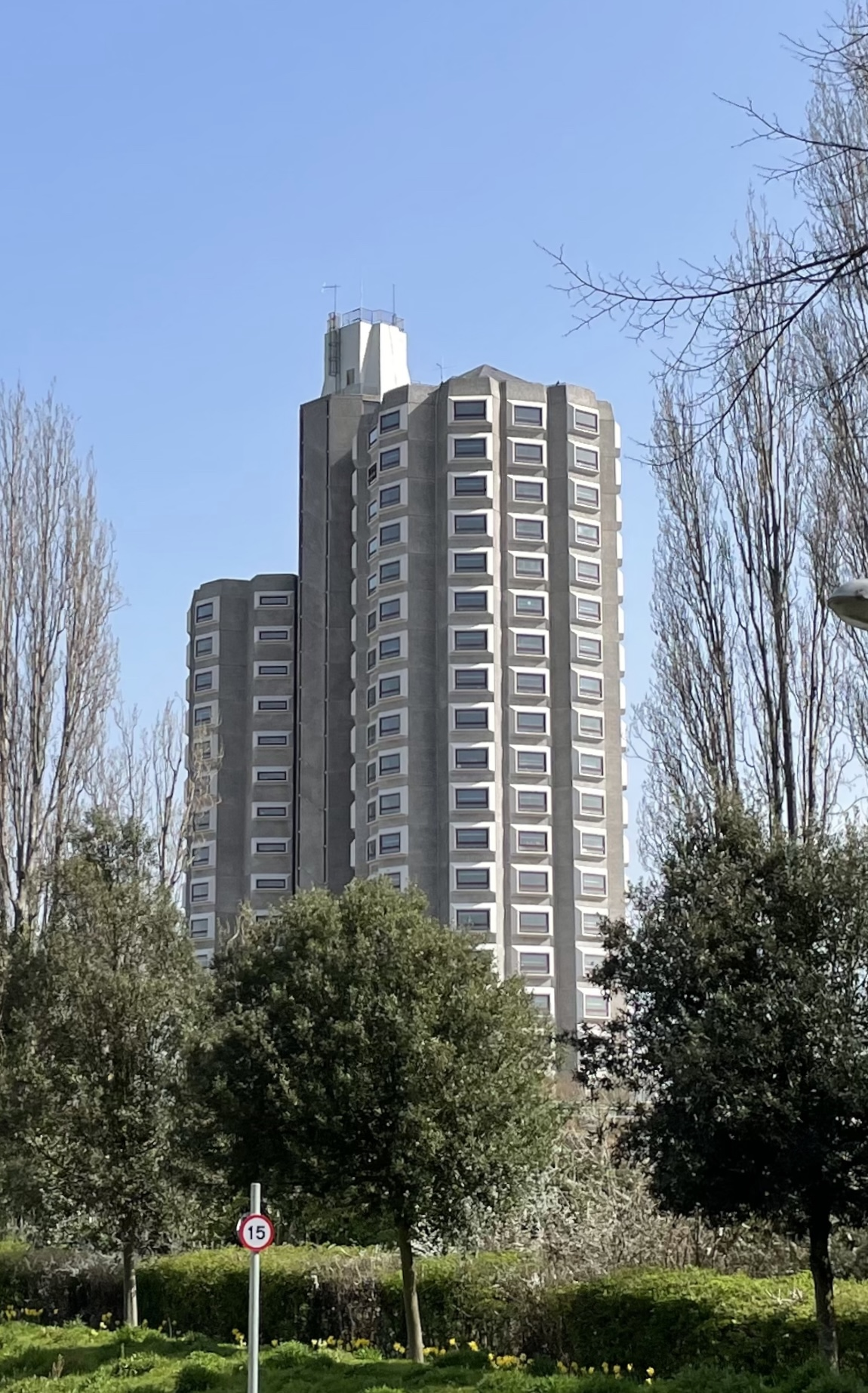
The university's iconic Towers Hall in 2021

Name	Location	Open to	Catering status
Robert Bakewell	Village Park	Undergraduates only	Self-catering
Butler Court (with A Block)	East Park	Undergraduates only	Self-catering
Cayley	Village Park	Undergraduates only	Catered
Claudia Parsons	Village Park	Undergraduates only	Self-catering
David Collett	West Park	Undergraduates only	Catered
Falkner–Eggington	Central Park	Undergraduates and postgraduates	Self-catering
Faraday	Village Park	Undergraduates only	Catered
Harry French Historic Hall	Off campus	Undergraduates and postgraduates	Self-catering
Hazlerigg–Rutland	Village Park	Undergraduates only	Self-catering
The Holt	Off campus	Undergraduates only	Self-catering
William Morris	Off campus	Undergraduates only	Self-catering
John Phillips	Village Park	Postgraduates and undergraduates	Self-catering
Elvyn Richards	Village Park	Undergraduates only	Catered
Royce	Village Park	Undergraduates only	Catered
Rutherford	Village Park	Undergraduates only	Catered
Telford	Village Park	Undergraduates only	Self-catering
Towers Hall	East Park	Undergraduates only	Catered

Of these, Hazlerigg–Rutland, John Phillips, Elvyn Richards and Telford have names that were previously used for halls of residence that have since been repurposed, renamed or merged with other halls. In 2015 Loughborough University ranked first in the UK for accommodation on a university review platform StudentCrowd.

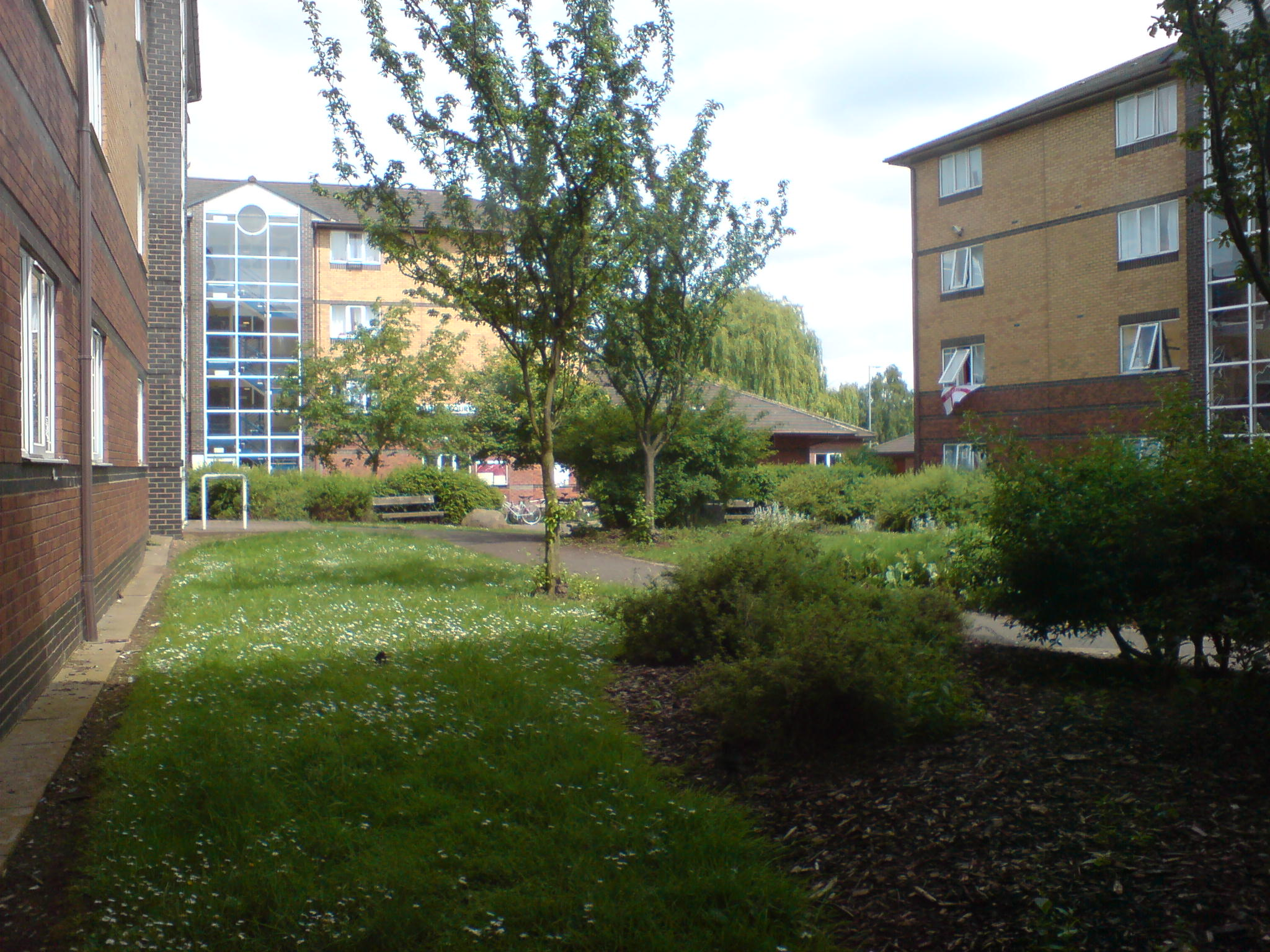
Butler Court Hall

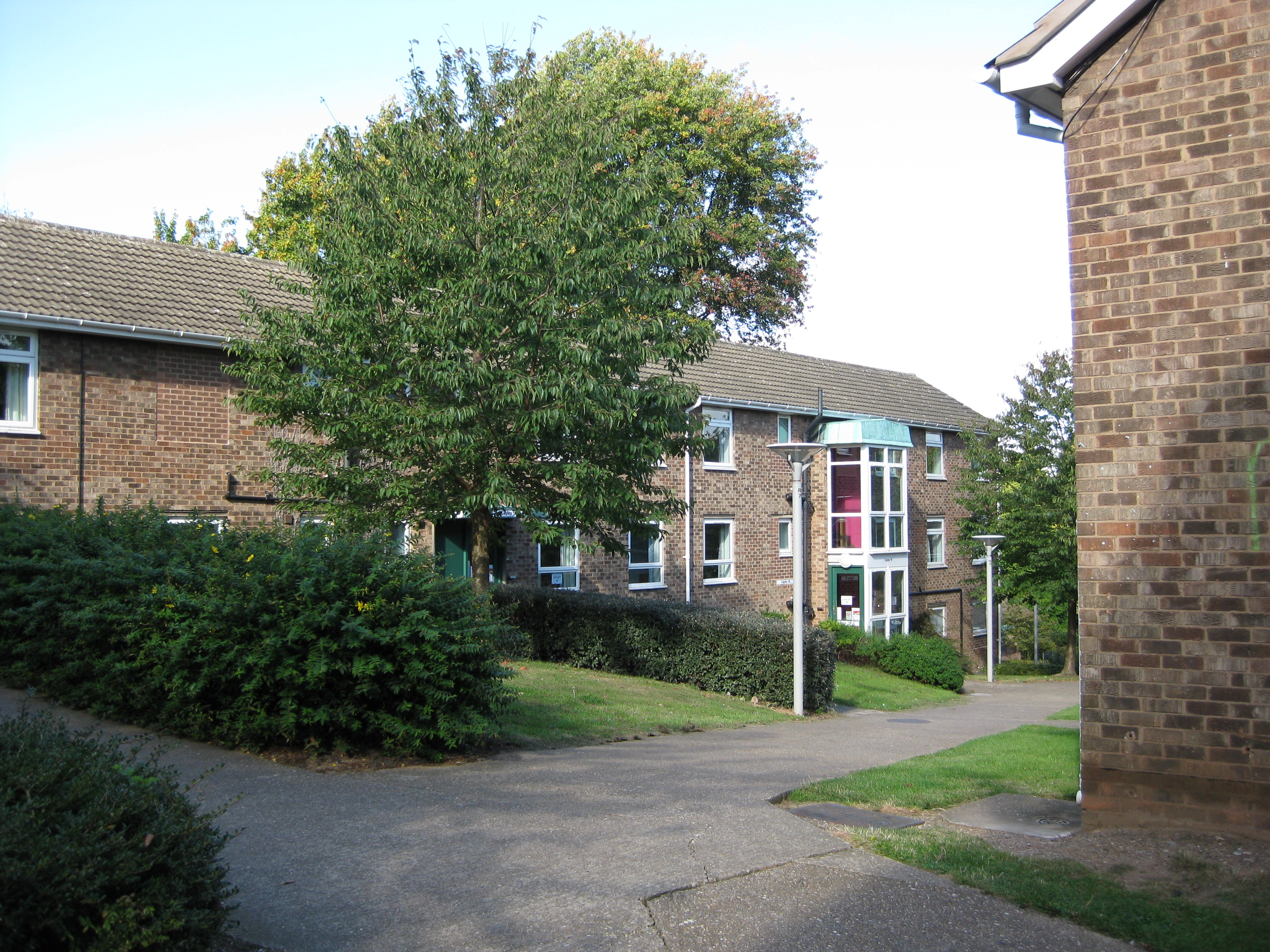
Cayley Hall

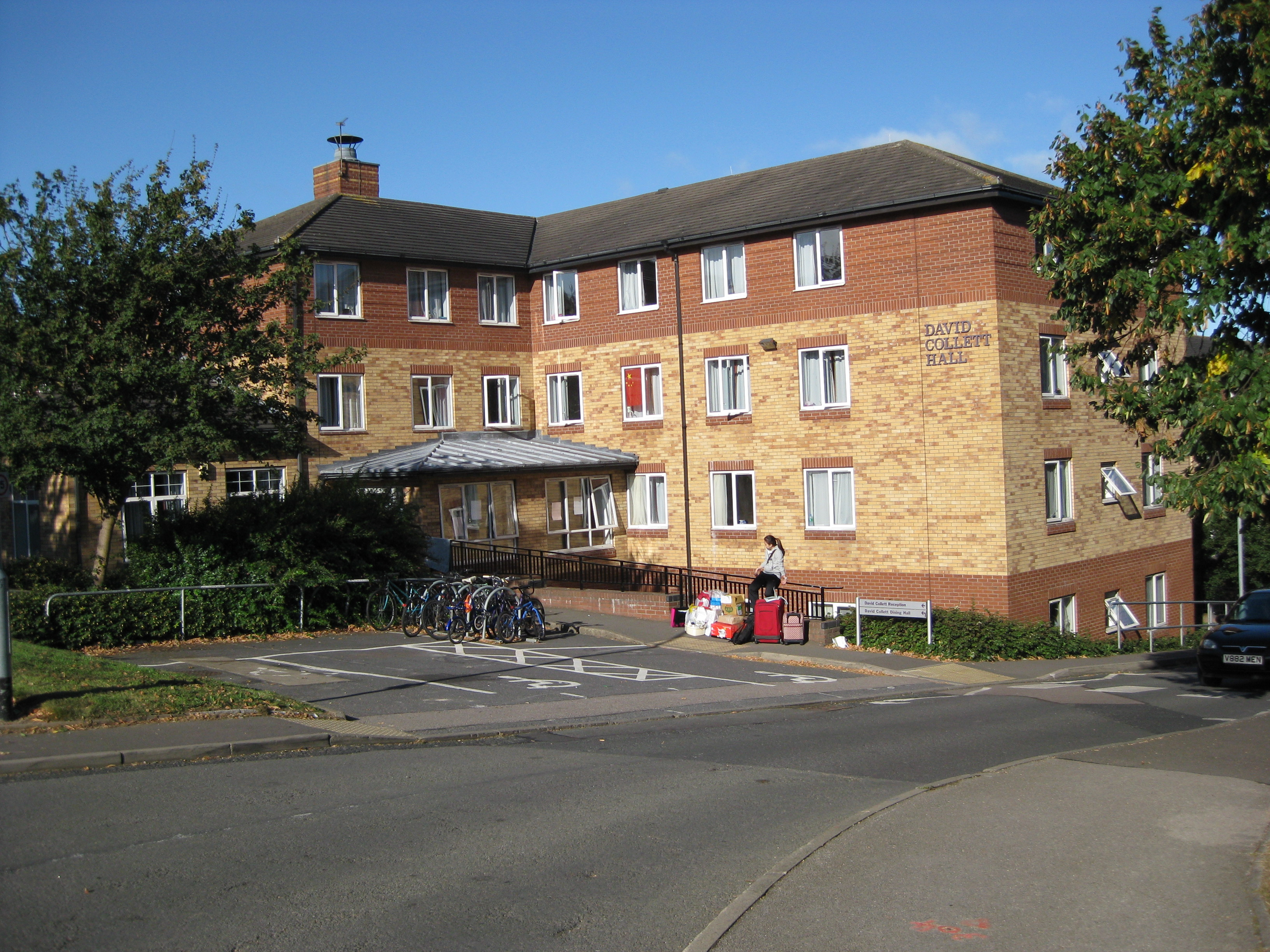
David Collett Hall

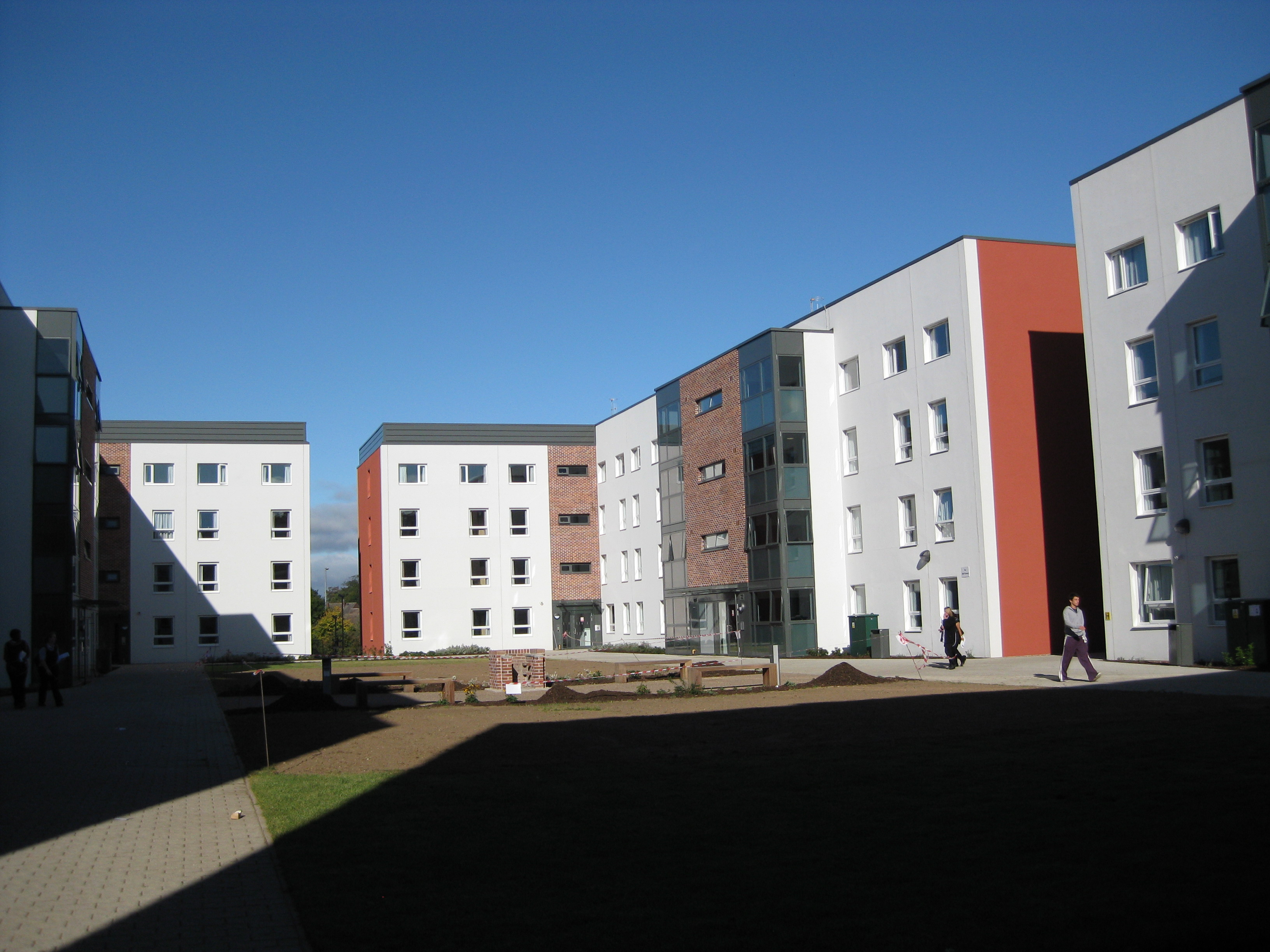
Elvyn Richards Hall

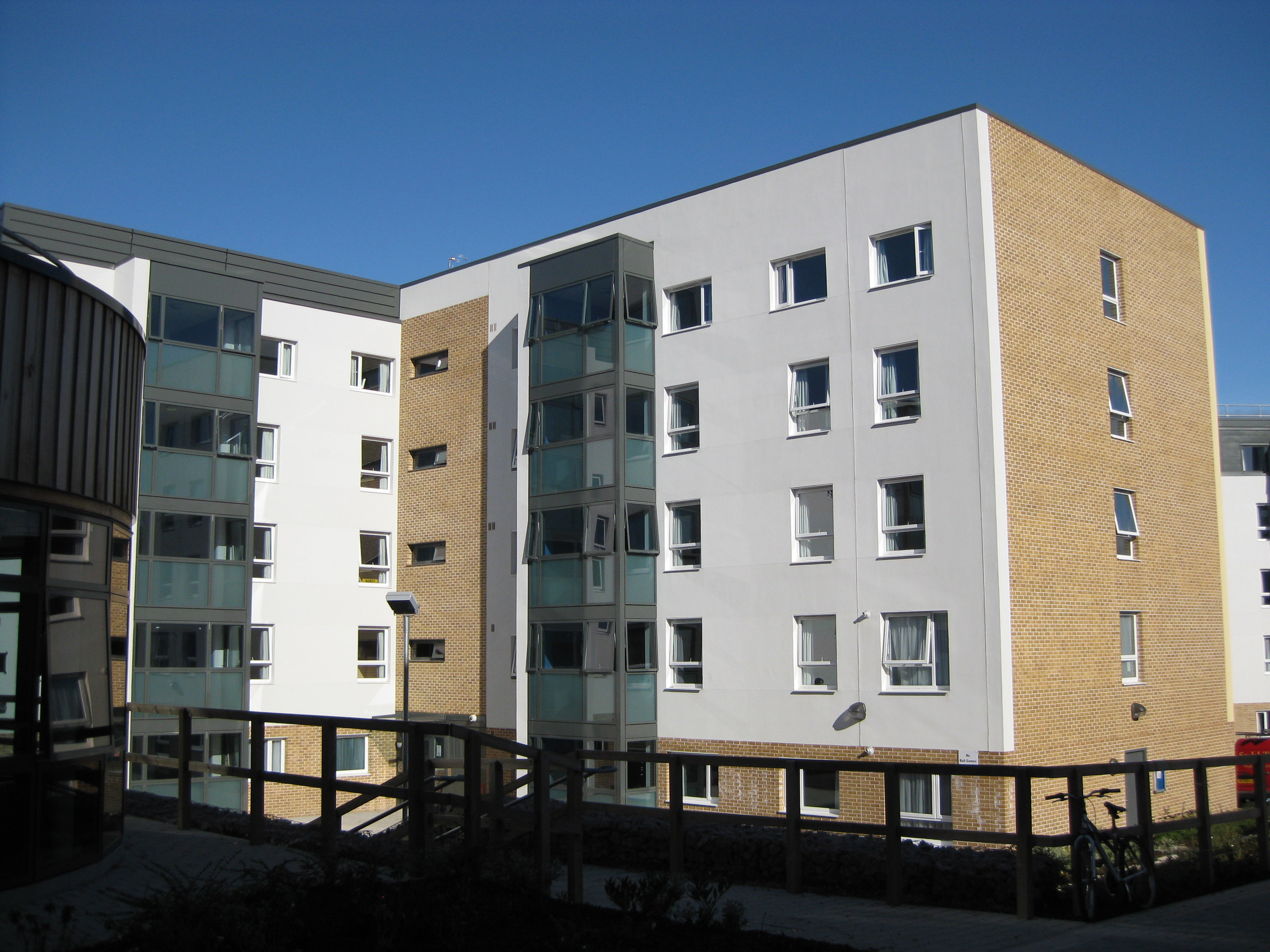
Hazlerigg-Rutland Hall

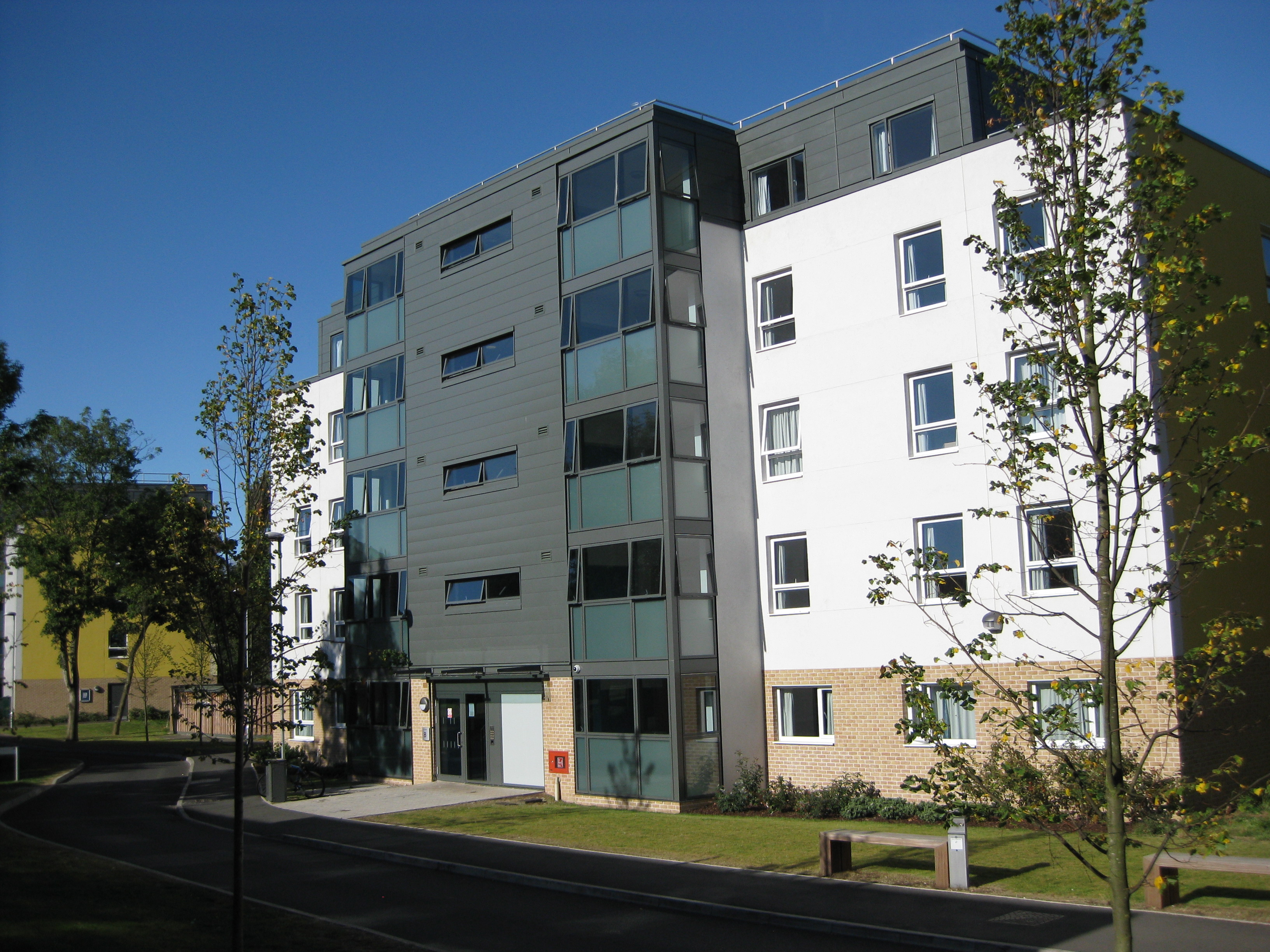
John Phillips Hall

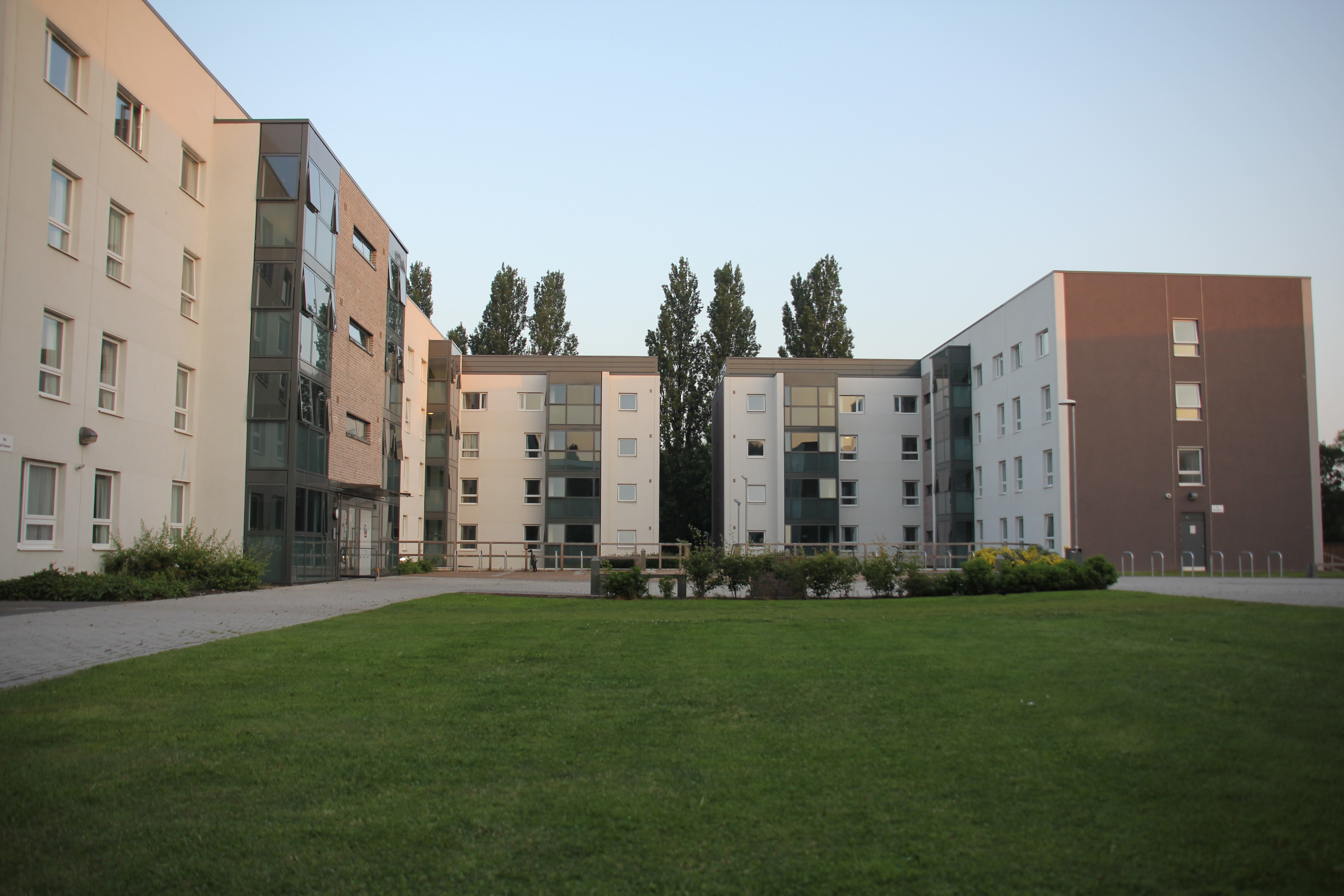
Robert Bakewell Hall

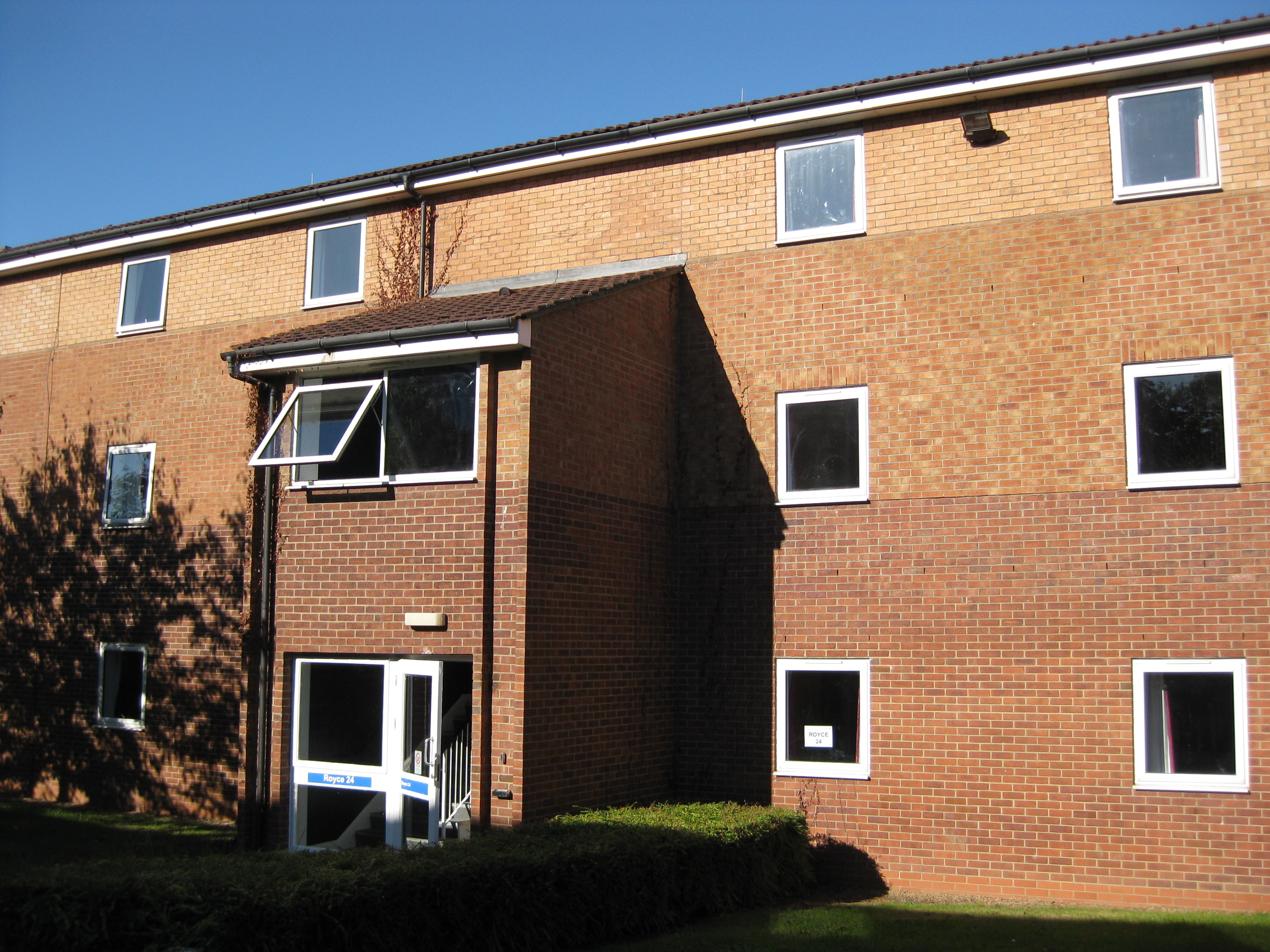
Royce Hall

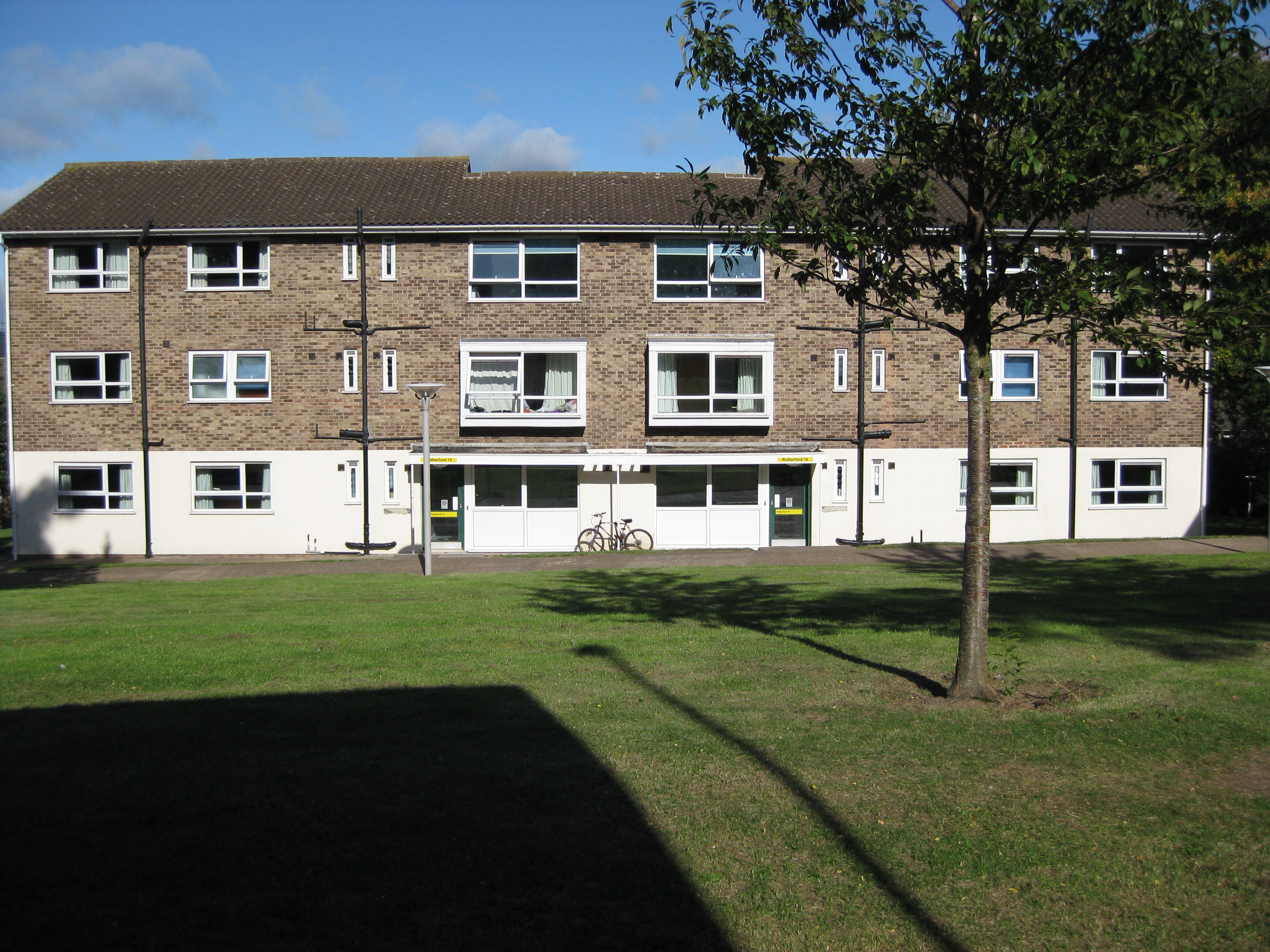
Rutherford Hall

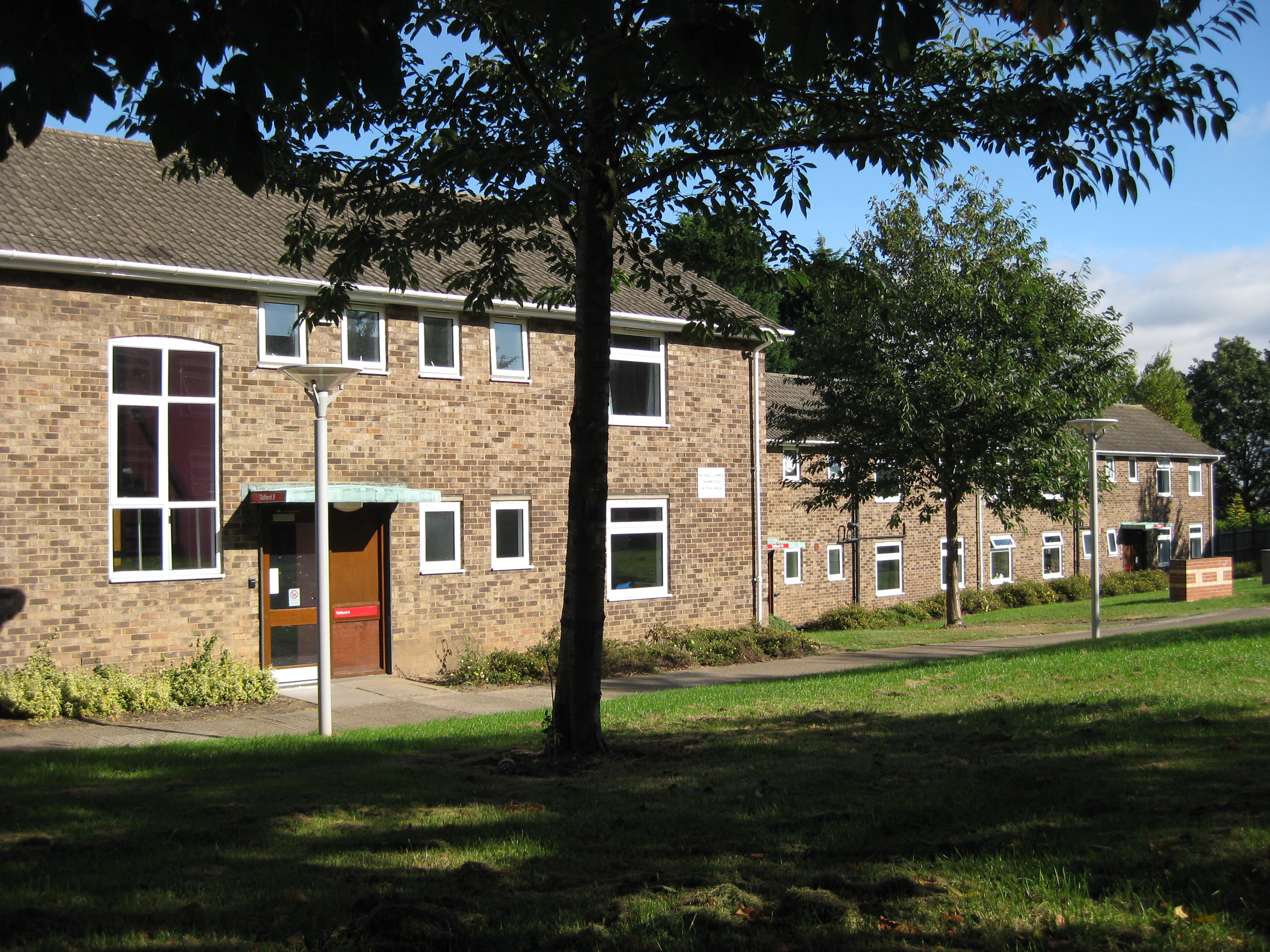
Telford Hall

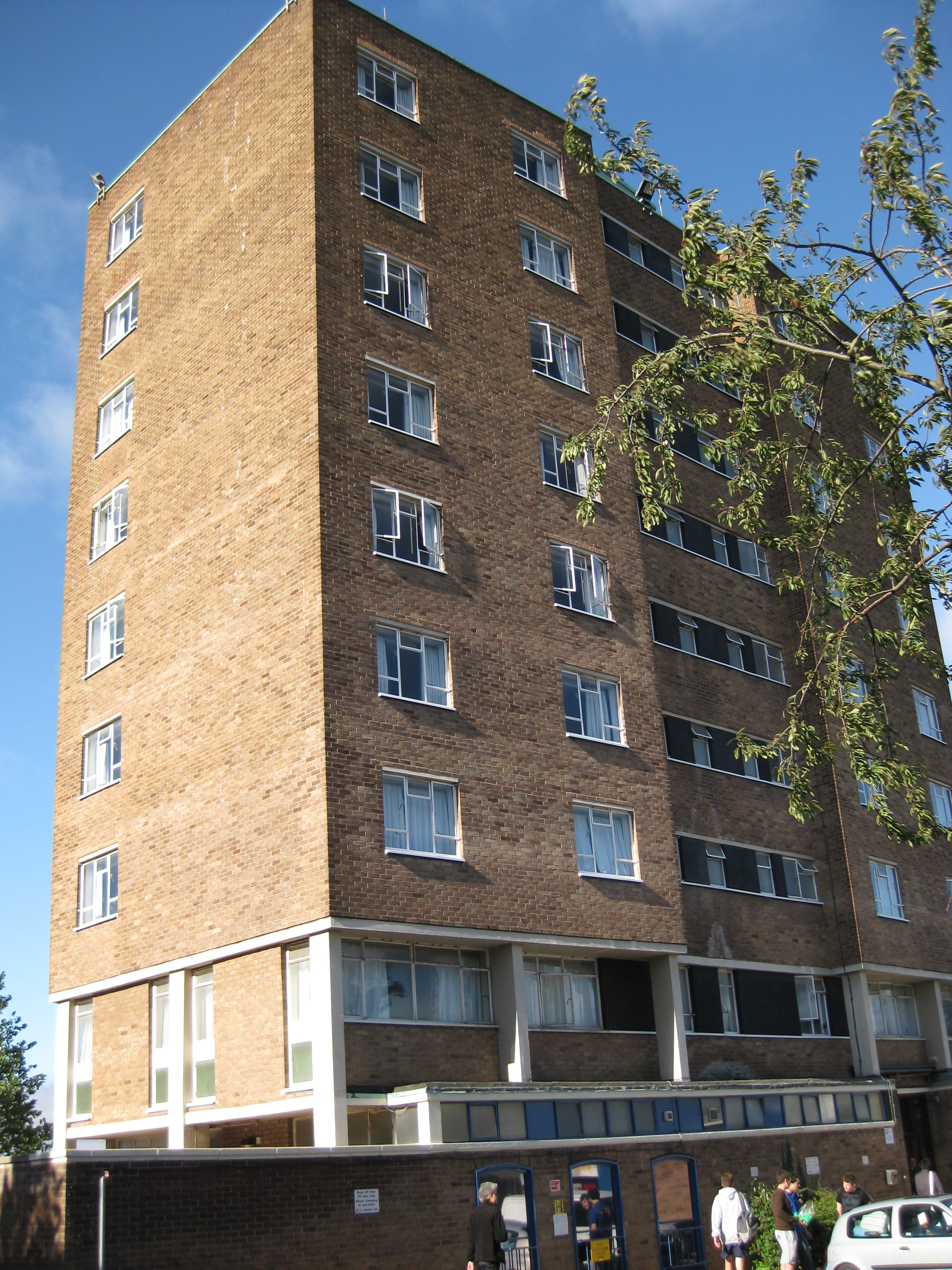
Whitworth Tower, latterly part of Rutherford Hall (Demolished in autumn 2023)

=== Fitness facilities ===
Loughborough University has extensive sport and fitness facilities. These include two main gyms, namely Powerbase and Holywell, an Olympic size swimming pool, netball and tennis centres, and a High Performance Athletics Centre.

== University leadership ==
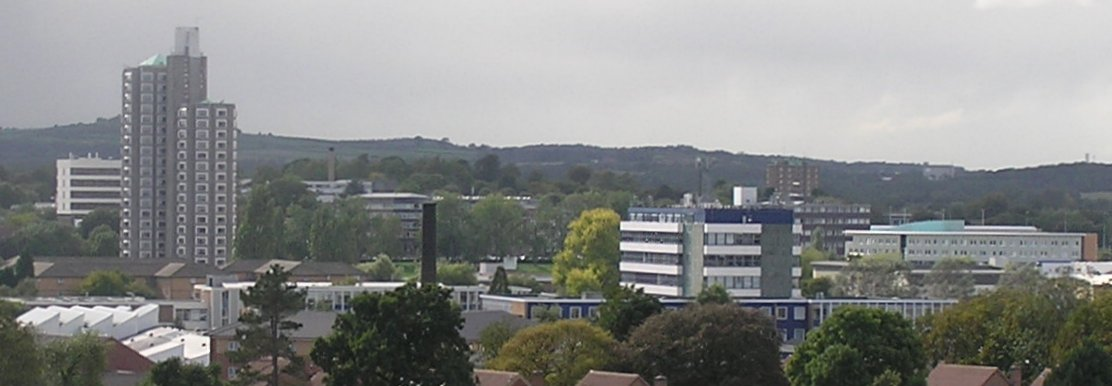
Loughborough University's campus from the town's Carillon tower.

=== Chairmen of Governors / Chair of University Council ===
- A. A. Bumpus (1909–1925)
- B. B. Barrow (1925–1934)
- William Bastard (1934–1936)
- W. H. Wright (1936–1940)
- Sir Robert Martin (1940–1952)
- Sir Harold West (1952–1957)
- Sir Edward Herbert (1957–1963)
- Sir Herbert Manzoni (1963–1966)
- David Collett (1966-1981)
- Dr Harry French (1981-1986)
- Sir B. R. Dean (1992–2015)
- Sir Peter Bonfield (2016-2020)
- Christine Hodgson CBE (2021–present)

=== Chancellors ===
- Lord Pilkington (1966–1980)
- Sir Arnold Hall (1980–1989)
- Sir Denis Rooke (1989–2003)
- Sir John Jennings (2003–2010)
- Sir Nigel Rudd (2010–2016)
- Lord Coe (2017–)

=== Principals ===
- S. C. Laws (1909–1915)
- Herbert Schofield (1915–1950)
- Major-General W. F. Hasted (1951–1952)
- H. E. Falkner, J. W. Bridgeman and C. D. Bentley (interim 'triumvirate' January–September 1952)
- Wing Commander H. E. Falkner (1952–1953) (acting)
- Herbert Haslegrave (1953–1966)

=== Vice-Chancellors ===
- Herbert Haslegrave (1966–1967)
- Elfyn J. Richards (1967–1975)
- Sir Clifford Butler (1975–1985)
- John G. Phillips (1986–1987)
- Sir David Davies (1988–1993)
- Sir David Wallace (1994–2005)
- Shirley Pearce (2006–2012)
- Robert Allison (2012–2021)
- Nick Jennings (2021–present)

== International programmes ==
Loughborough University and Kazakhstan's Bolashak scholarship programme signed a cooperation agreement in 2018. The agreement enables taught master's and PhD students to study at the university's two campuses in the East Midlands and London.

== Notable alumni ==
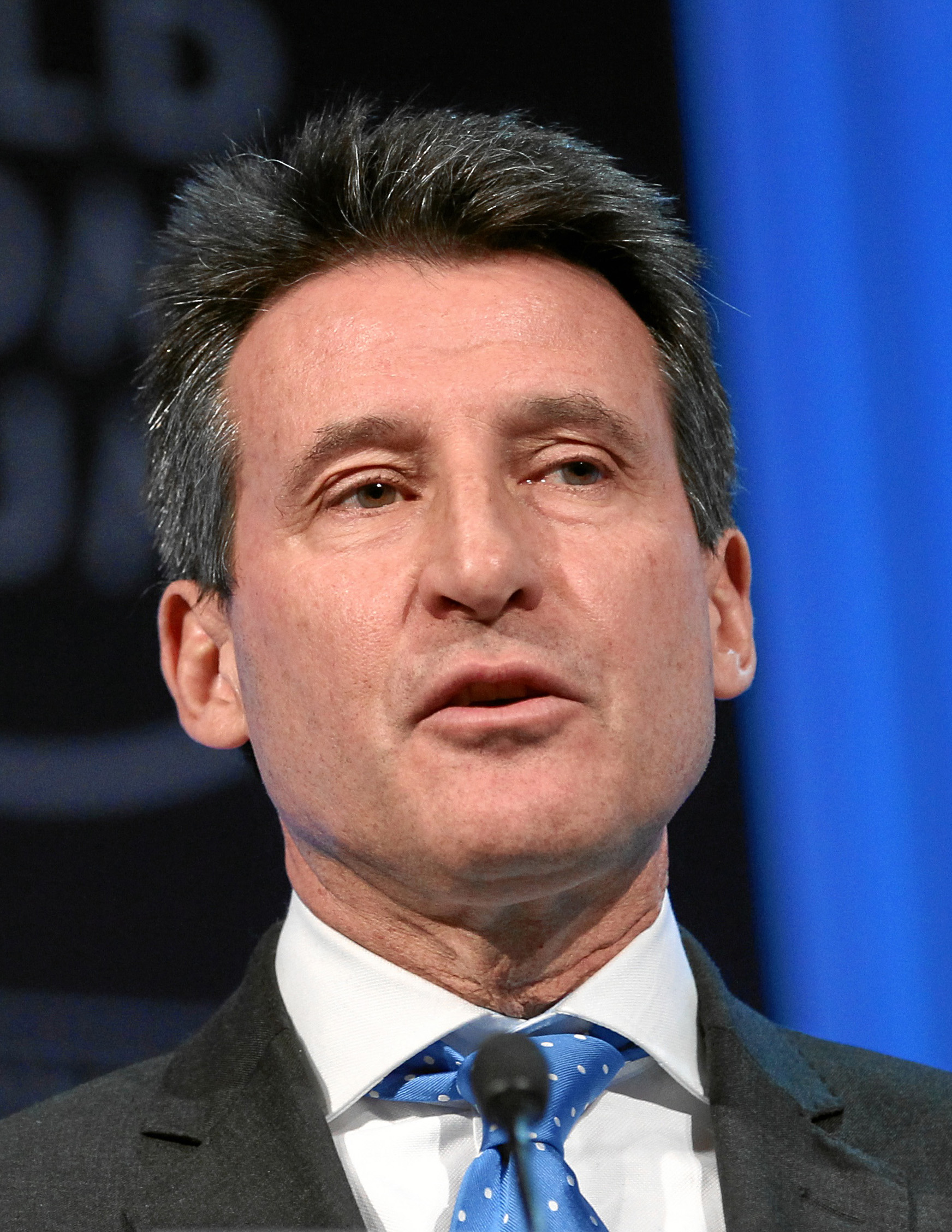
Sebastian Coe, Olympic athlete and current Loughborough University chancellor

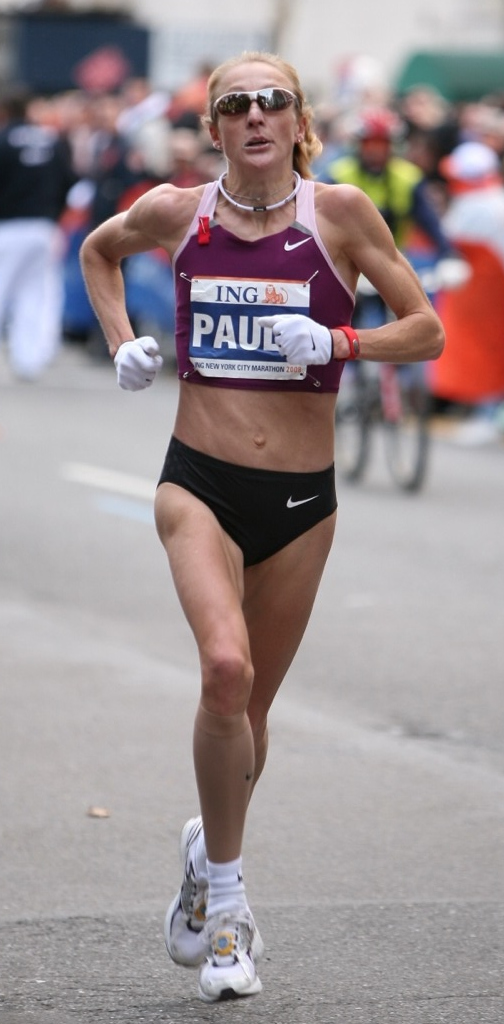
Paula Radcliffe, three-time London Marathon winner

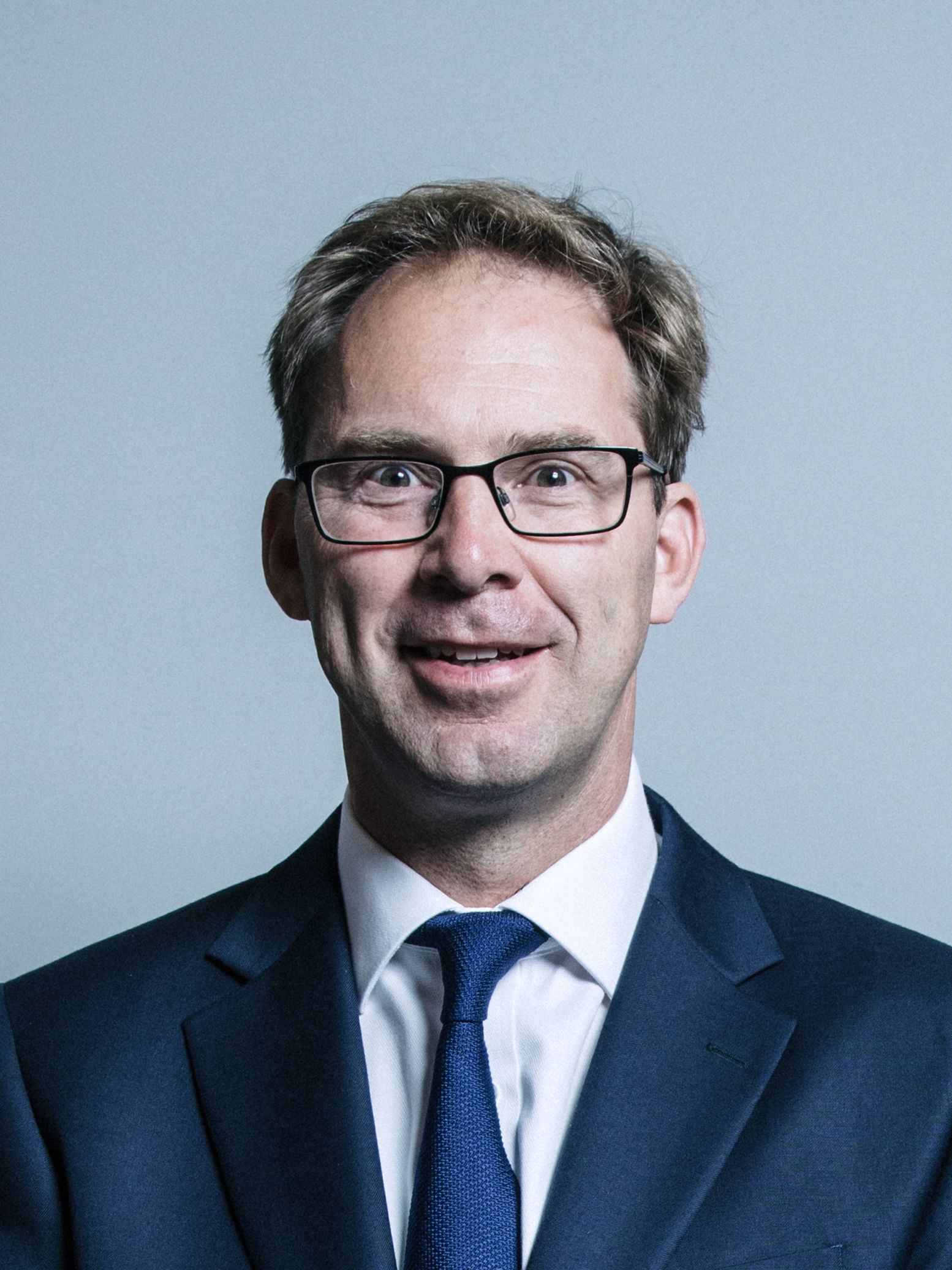
Tobias Ellwood, Conservative MP

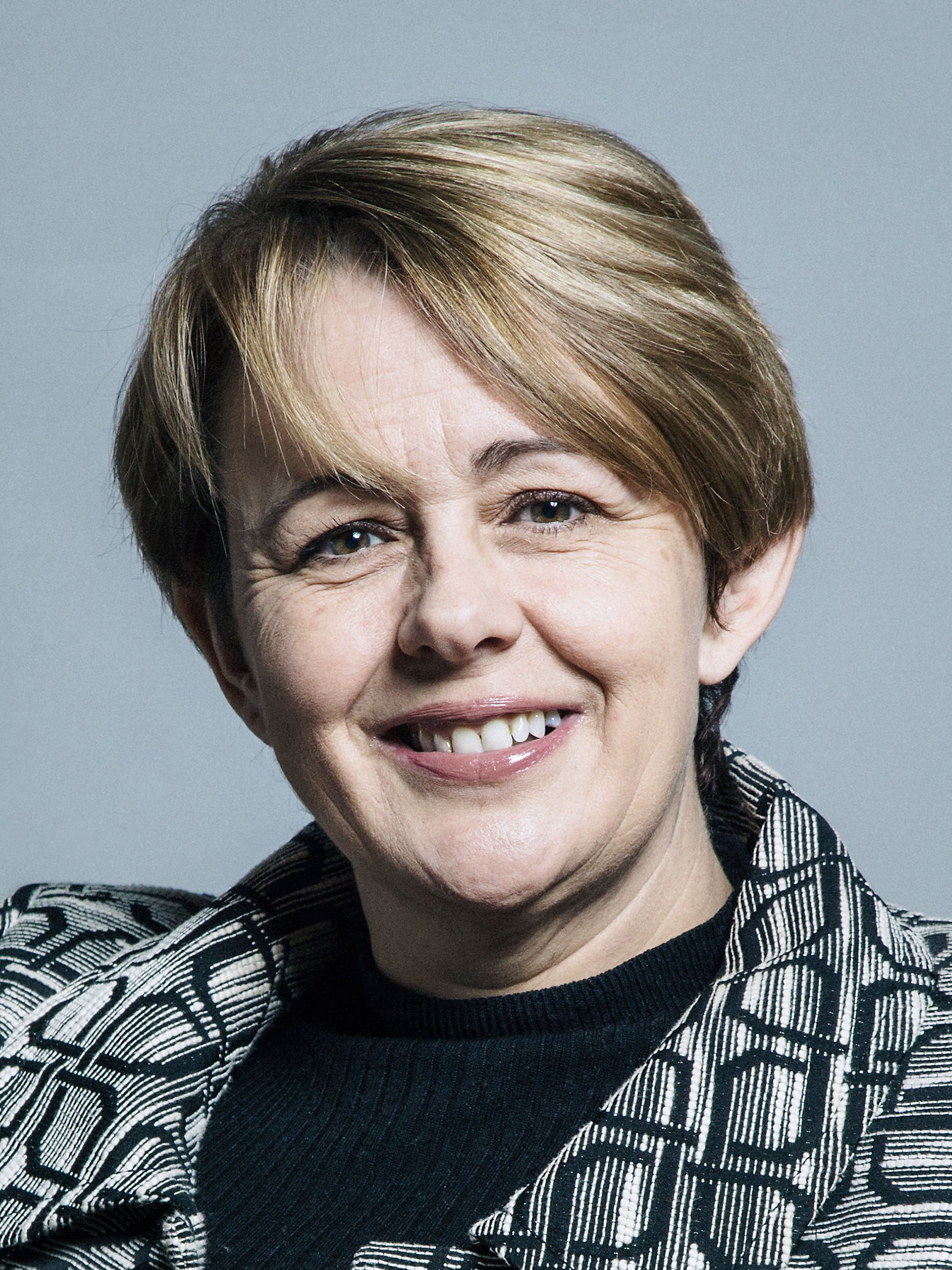
Tanni Grey-Thompson, politician and former wheelchair racer

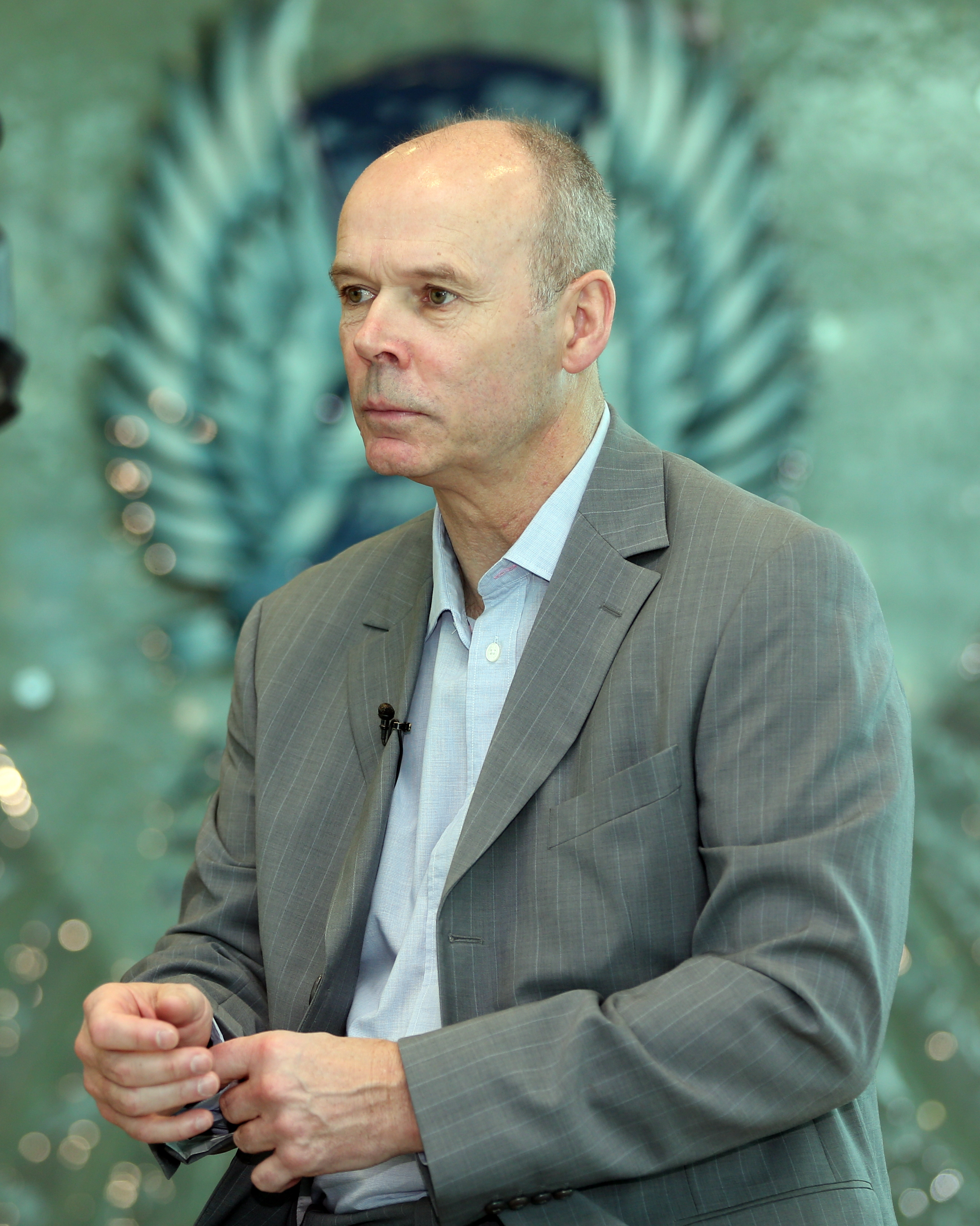
Clive Woodward, former rugby union player and coach
- Derek Abbott – physicist and electronic engineer
- Adnan al-Janabi – Iraqi politician
- Karen Almond – England and Great Britain international rugby union player. Captained England to victory in the 1994 Women's Rugby World Cup.
- Marissa Anita – Indonesian actress, journalist and presenter
- Charles Armstrong-Jones, Viscount Linley – grandson of Princess Margaret and great-nephew of Queen Elizabeth II
- Steve Backley– javelin thrower
- Adrian Bailey – retired Labour Co-operative politician, Member of Parliament (MP)
- Cassandre Beaugrand - French triathlete, Olympic Gold Medalist at 2024 Summer Olympics.
- Daniel Bennett – Singapore footballer
- Sam Billings – England International and Big Bash cricket player
- Sir Peter Bonfield – chief executive of ICL and BT Group
- Adam Bishop – winner of the 2020 Britain's Strongest Man competition
- Robbie Brightwell – athlete, European 440 yards champion 1962
- Victoria Clarke, psychologist
- Sebastian Coe – Olympic athlete and Chairman of the London Organising Committee for the Olympic Games
- David Collier – cricket administrator and businessman, chief executive of the England and Wales Cricket Board (ECB)
- James Collins – sports nutritionist
- John Cooper – Olympic silver medallist at 440 yards hurdles in Tokyo 1964, died in the Paris air disaster 1974
- Fran Cotton – rugby footballer
- James Dasaolu – athletics sprinter
- Gerald Davies – Wales and British Lion rugby union player, The Times journalist, and manager of the British and Irish Lions in South Africa 2009
- John Dawes – Wales and British Lions rugby player, captaining the British Lions in South Africa 1971
- Patrick Dever - Olympic athlete Paris 2024, marathoner
- Andy Donaldson – swimmer
- Mary Earps – football player
- Ross Edgley – adventurer, ultra-marathon sea swimmer and author
- Tobias Ellwood – Conservative MP
- Ozak Esu – electronics engineer
- Diane Farr – Numb3rs actress
- Lorna Fitzsimmons – NUS President and Labour Party MP
- James Gibson – swimmer
- Rosalind Gill – Professor of Social and Cultural Analysis, King's College, London
- Lisa Goldman – theatre director and writer
- Tanni Grey-Thompson – athlete
- Steve Hallam – former head of race team for the McLaren Mercedes Formula 1 Team
- Kimberley Halton-Farrow – triathlete
- Emma Hatton – actress, lead role in Wicked 2016
- Liam Hennessy – exercise physiologist, strength and conditioning coach, and former international athlete
- Maddie Hinch – field hockey player
- Benjamin Hubert – industrial designer
- Jacob Jones - professional rugby league footballer
- Johnnie Johnson – Spitfire ace of World War II, when it was Loughborough College
- Ben Kay – England rugby union World Cup 2003 winner
- Donna Kellogg – badminton player
- Doug King - businessman and Coventry City Owner
- Nick Knight – England international cricketer
- Jeanette Kwakye – athlete
- Ayao Komatsu – team principal of Haas F1 Team
- Will Lenney – YouTuber
- Steve Ley – chemist
- Lisa Lynch – journalist
- Rahul Mandal – research engineer and The Great British Bake Off winner
- John Mantle – Wales rugby union and Great Britain rugby league player
- Steve Matchett – former F1 mechanic, author and TV presenter
- Murray McArthur – Game of Thrones and Doctor Who actor
- Kirsty McDermott - 3xtimes Commonwealth Games gold medallist
- Colin McFadyean – England and British Lions rugby union player
- Colin McFarlane – The Dark Knight actor
- Laurent Mekies – team principal of Red Bull Racing in Formula One, former team principal of Racing Bulls
- Graeme Mitcheson – sculptor
- David Moorcroft – runner
- Val Moore – Wasps Ladies player, Great Britain international and England women's team manager (1994 World Cup winner)
- Ore Oduba – broadcaster and former Strictly Come Dancing champion
- Neil Oatley – design and development director in Formula One teams
- Christopher O'Donnell – Olympic track and field athlete
- Nicholas Osipczak – professional mixed martial artist
- Monty Panesar – England Test cricketer
- David Pearson - Editor, author, and librarian
- Sarah Pochin – Reform UK MP
- Beth Potter - triathlete, Olympic Bronze Medalist at 2024 Summer Olympics, and world champion (2023).
- Nirmal Purja - mountaineer and world record holder
- Paula Radcliffe – athlete
- Chris Read – England Cricket wicketkeeper
- Mark Richardson – 400 m athlete
- Bridget Riley – artist
- Andy Robinson – rugby player / coach
- Lisa Rogers – television presenter
- Lawrie Sanchez – football manager
- Mohd Sapuan Salit – Professor of material science at Universiti Putra Malaysia
- Malcolm Sayer – Jaguar Cars designer and engineer
- Peter Scott – chemist
- Robbie Simpson – Huddersfield Town FC footballer in League One
- Rob Smedley – former director of data systems at Formula 1
- Steve Speirs – Stella (UK TV series) actor – studied drama under birth name Steven Roberts
- Joy Spence – master blender
- Brian Stubbs – footballer
- Jodie Swallow – triathlete
- Michael Swift – professional rugby union player and record-holder for appearances in Pro12
- John Taylor – Wales rugby union player, who refused to tour with British Lions in apartheid South Africa
- Zack Test – rugby union player
- Paul Thomas – founding Vice-Chancellor of University of the Sunshine Coast
- Lee Tong-soung - United Koreans in Japan official football team player
- Hugo Turner and Ross Turner (The Turner Twins) – adventurers
- Bob Wilson – Arsenal goalkeeper
- Sir Clive Woodward – England rugby union coach
- Roger Wrightson – cricket player

== See also ==
- Armorial of UK universities
- College of advanced technology (United Kingdom)
- List of universities in the UK
