= Towers Hall =

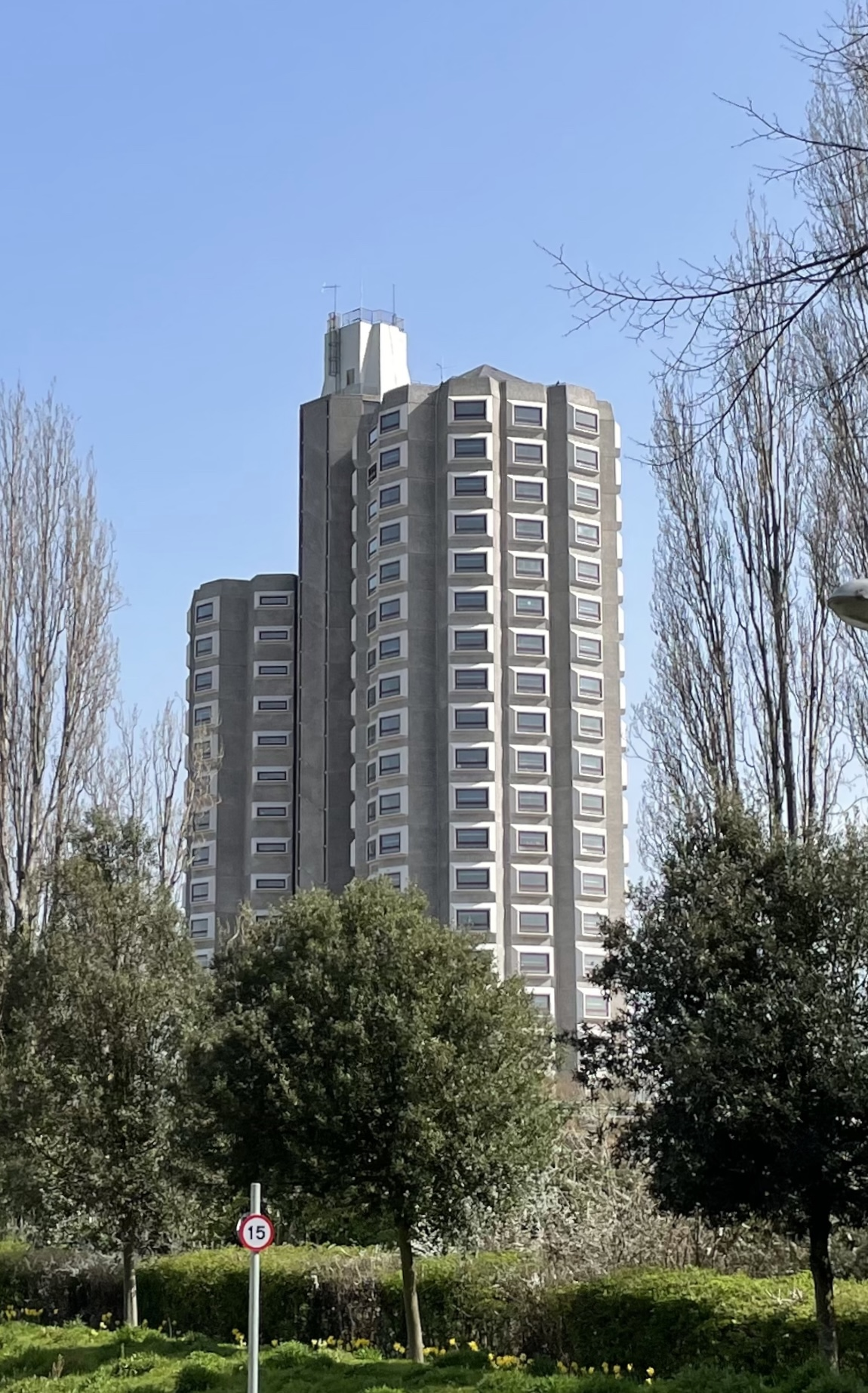
- Towers Hall from the west

General information
- Architectural style: Brutalist
- Location: Loughborough University, Loughborough, Leicestershire, United Kingdom
- Year built: 1963-1965

Height
- Height: 64m (210ft)

Design and construction
- Architecture firm: Gollins, Melvin, Ward, and Partners

Towers Hall, or Towers, is a university hall of residence in Loughborough, Leicestershire, England. It belongs to and is on the main campus of Loughborough University, housing up to 310 students.

== History ==
Towers Hall was constructed as part of a masterplan by Gollins, Melvin, Ward, and Partners in 1963–5. Towers was built as part of the Loughborough College of Education, prior to the 1977 merger with the university. It was constructed between 1963-5 and opened for residents in September 1967. The building was designed by architectural practice Gollins, Melvin, Ward, and Partners, who were also responsible for large segments of the University of Sheffield during the same period; for example, the Library and Arts Tower. Towers Hall was built as the centre point of a courtyard of surrounding teaching blocks of one or two storeys. Currently only the Matthew Arnold building survives following the demolition of the remainder in the early 21st century. The building is locally listed by Charnwood Borough Council.

== Architecture and fittings ==
It was designed as a cohesive complex including low-level teaching blocks surrounding the central residential towers. The entrance to the west tower is located on the north side of the building, via a large, recessed opening with a set of concrete steps leading to the door. This is mirrored in the entrance to the east tower which is located at the south side of the building.

At ground floor level, both towers originally had full-height openings underneath to enable foot-passage beneath the structure, these have since been in-filled. The windows are metal-framed and extrude from the main elevation in chamfered pre-cast concrete panels.

At the base of the east tower, there is a modern extension housing a common room which was constructed in 2016.
