= Bridget Shield =

British acoustics researcher

Bridget Mary Shield MBE (née West) is a leading researcher on acoustics.

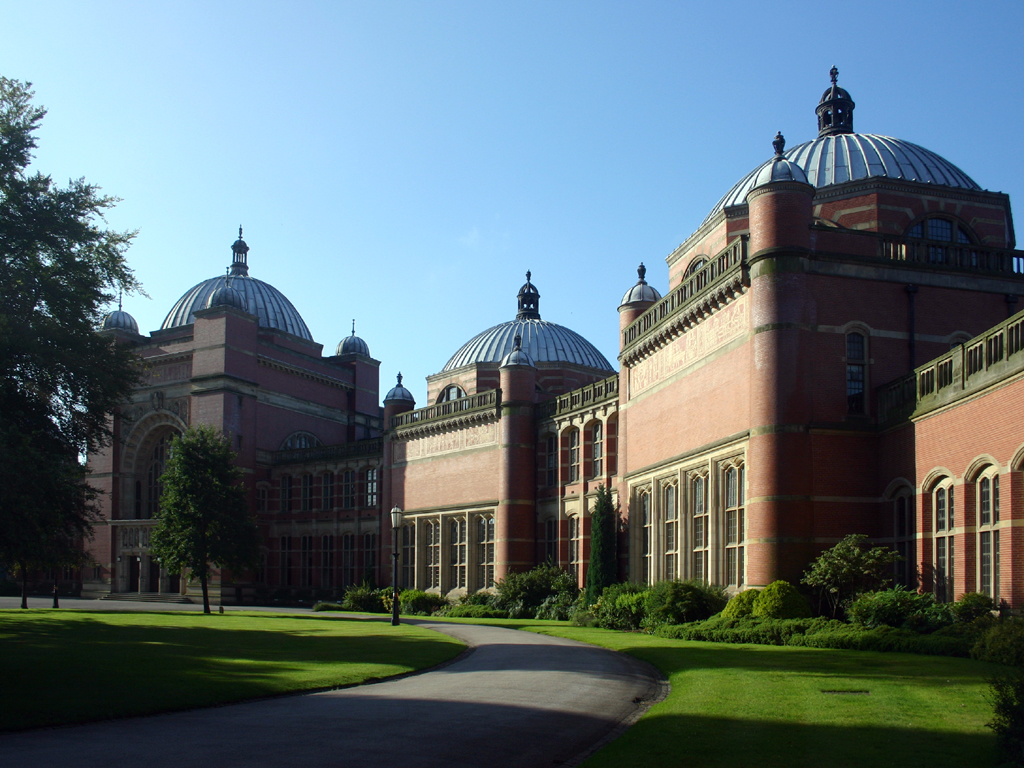
Birmingham University

Shield graduated from Birmingham University with a BSc in Pure Mathematics in 1968, an MSc in mathematics in 1969 and a PhD in Engineering Production in 1979.

Shield was the first female President of the Institute of Acoustics from 2012 to 2014. Shield was Professor of Acoustics in the Department of Urban Engineering in the Faculty of Engineering, Science and Built Environment at London South Bank University. She was a leading researcher on the effects of noise on children and how it affects their ability to learn. In 2003 she was appointed by the Department for Education and Skills as editor of Building Bulletin 93 (BB93), which contains the acoustic performance specifications for schools. Shield worked with Trevor Cox on Public Understanding of Science projects. She chaired the 10th International Congress on Noise as a Public Health Problem in London.

Shield was awarded the R W B Stephens Medal by the Institute of Acoustics in 2011. The medal is awarded in odd-numbered years for outstanding contributions to acoustics research or education. She was elected an Honorary Fellow of the Institute of Acoustics in 2007. Shield received the John Connell Lifetime Achievement Award from the Noise Abatement Society in 2011. She was awarded the title of Emeritus Professor upon her retirement from London South Bank University in 2014.

She was appointed Member of the Order of the British Empire (MBE) in the 2021 Birthday Honours for services to acoustics science and voluntary service to inclusion in science and engineering.
