= Umnov =

Umnov (Russian: Умнов, from умный meaning smart) is a Russian masculine surname, its feminine counterpart is Umnova. Notable people with the surname include:

- Olga Umnova, Russian-British scientist
- Valeri Umnov (born 1974), Russian football player
