= Tyndall Medal =

The Tyndall Medal is a prize from the Institute of Acoustics awarded every two years to a citizen of the UK, preferably under the age of 40, for "achievement and services in the field of acoustics". The prize is named after John Tyndall (1820–1893) who preceded Rayleigh as the Professor of Natural Philosophy at the Royal Institution. He investigated the acoustic properties of the atmosphere and though a distinguished experimental physicist, he is remembered primarily as one of the world's most brilliant scientific lecturers.

== List of recipients ==
Source: Institute of Acoustics

- 1975 M E Delany
- 1978 H Geoffrey Leventhall
- 1980 Robin K Mackenzie
- 1982 Frank J Fahy
- 1984 Robert G (Bob) White
- 1986 J G Charles
- 1988 Michael F E Barron
- 1990 Nicholas G Pace
- 1992 Stephen J Elliott and Philip A Nelson
- 1994 Roger K Moore
- 1996 Simon N Chandler-Wilde
- 1998 J E T (Jim) Griffiths
- 2000 Yui Wei Lam
- 2002 Prof Timothy Leighton
- 2004 Trevor Cox
- 2006 Kirill Horoshenkov
- 2008 Prof Jian Kang
- 2010 Olga Umnova
- 2012 Dr Carl Hopkins
- 2014 Dr Stephen Dance
- 2016 Jonathan Hargreaves
- 2018 Dr Filippo Fazi
- 2023 Dr Joshua Meggitt

== See also ==
- List of physics awards
