= List of physics awards =

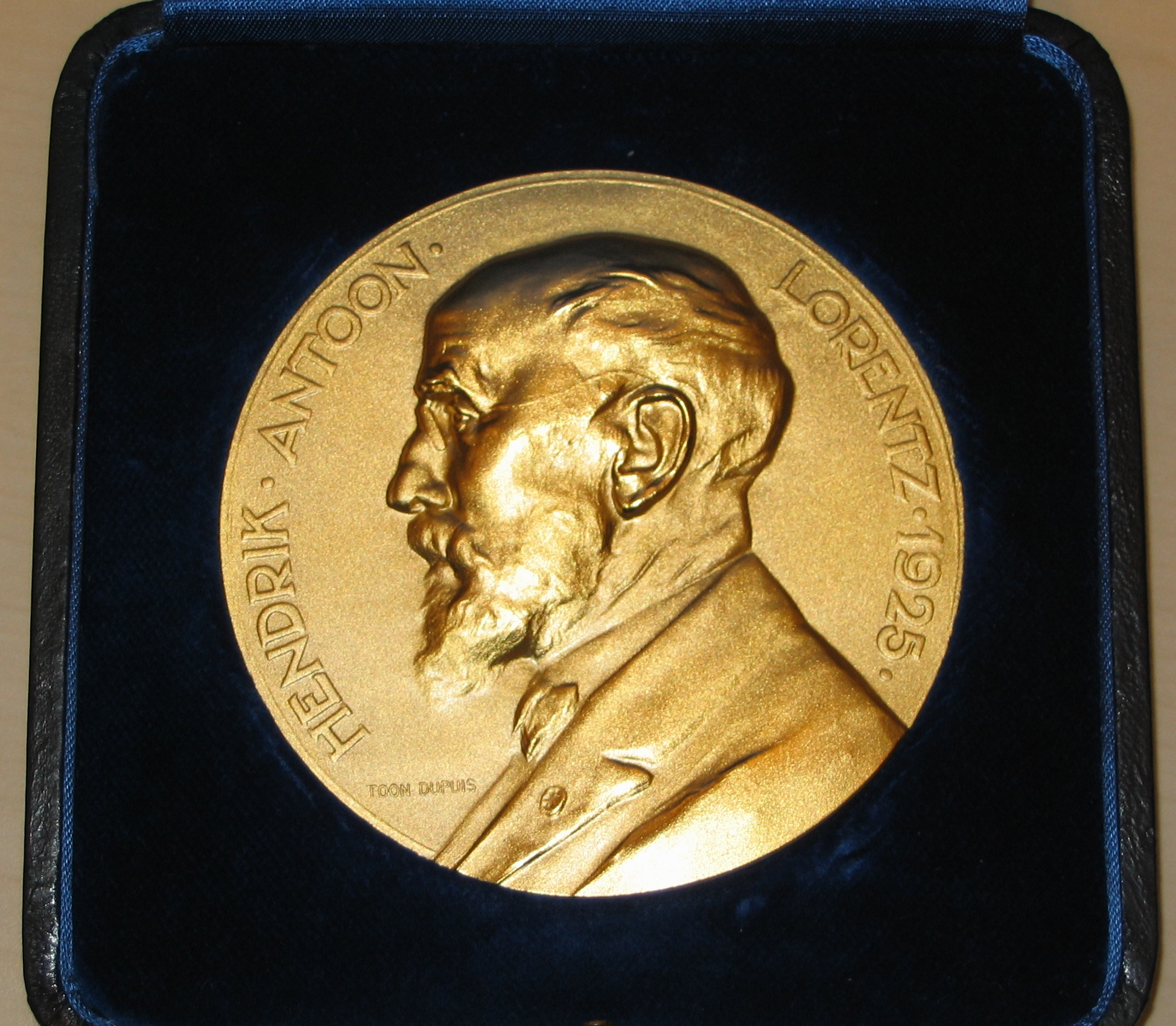
The Lorentz Medal

This list of physics awards is an index to articles about notable awards for physics. The list is organized by region and country of the organization that gives the award. Awards are not necessarily restricted to people from the country of the award giver.

== International ==
| Country | Award | Sponsor | Notes |
|---|---|---|---|
| International | Albert Einstein World Award of Science | World Cultural Council | Recognition and encouragement for scientific and technological research and development |
| International | IUPAP Early Career Scientist Prize | International Union of Pure and Applied Physics | Recognizes contributions of early career physicists within the subfields of each IUPAP commission |
| International | Batchelor Prize | International Union of Theoretical and Applied Mechanics | Outstanding research in fluid dynamics |
| International | Boltzmann Medal | International Union of Pure and Applied Physics | Physicists who obtain new results concerning statistical mechanics |
| International | Breakthrough Prize in Fundamental Physics | Fundamental Physics Prize Foundation | Transformative advances in fundamental physics |
| International | Dirac Medal | International Centre for Theoretical Physics | Theoretical physics or mathematics |
| International | ICTP Prize | International Centre for Theoretical Physics | Theoretical physics or mathematics for young scientists |
| International | Dirac Medal | World Association of Theoretical and Computational Chemists | Outstanding computational chemist in the world under the age of 40 |
| International | Hamburg Prize for Theoretical Physics | Hamburg Centre for Ultrafast Imaging | Outstanding contributions in the fields of atoms, molecules and quantum optics, and condensed matter |
| International | Henri Poincaré Prize | International Association of Mathematical Physics | Outstanding contributions in mathematical physics, and contributions which lay the groundwork for novel developments in this broad field |
| International | Fritz London Memorial Prize | International Union of Pure and Applied Physics | Contributions to the advances of the field of low temperature physics |
| International | Luigi G. Napolitano Award | International Astronautical Congress | Young scientist, below 30 years of age, who has contributed significantly to the advancement of the aerospace science |
| International | UNESCO Niels Bohr Medal | UNESCO | Contributions to physics through research that has or could have a significant influence on the world |
| International | Wigner Medal | International Colloquium on Group Theoretical Methods in Physics, Group Theory and Fundamental Physics Foundation | Contributions to the understanding of physics through group theory |

== Americas ==
| Country | Award | Sponsor | Notes |
|---|---|---|---|
| United States | Abraham Pais Prize for History of Physics | American Physical Society and American Institute of Physics | Scholarly achievements in the history of physics |
| United States | Andrei Sakharov Prize | American Physical Society | Leadership and/or achievements of scientists in upholding human rights |
| United States | Aneesur Rahman Prize for Computational Physics | American Physical Society | Achievement in computational physics research |
| United States | Arthur L. Schawlow Prize in Laser Science | American Physical Society | Contributions to basic research which uses lasers to advance our knowledge of the fundamental physical properties of materials and their interaction with light |
| United States | Dannie Heineman Prize for Mathematical Physics | American Physical Society and American Institute of Physics | Mathematical physics |
| United States | David Adler Lectureship Award in the Field of Materials Physics | American Physical Society | Contributor to the field of materials physics, who is noted for the quality of his/her research, review articles and lecturing |
| United States | Davisson–Germer Prize in Atomic or Surface Physics | American Physical Society | Work in atomic physics or surface physics |
| United States | Earle K. Plyler Prize for Molecular Spectroscopy | American Physical Society | Contributions to the field of molecular spectroscopy and dynamics |
| United States | Einstein Prize | American Physical Society | Accomplishments in the field of gravitational physics |
| United States | Fluid Dynamics Prize | American Physical Society | Achievement in fluid dynamics research |
| United States | Frank Isakson Prize for Optical Effects in Solids | American Physical Society | Optical research that leads to breakthroughs in the condensed matter sciences |
| United States | George E. Pake Prize | American Physical Society | Work by physicists combining original research accomplishments with leadership in the management of research or development in industry |
| United States | Hans Bethe Prize | American Physical Society | Work in theory, experiment or observation in the areas of astrophysics, nuclear physics, nuclear astrophysics, or closely related fields |
| United States | Herbert P. Broida Prize | American Physical Society | Experimental advances in the field of atomic and molecular spectroscopy or chemical physics |
| United States | Herman Feshbach Prize in Theoretical Nuclear Physics | American Physical Society | Achievements in theoretical nuclear physics |
| United States | I. I. Rabi Prize | American Physical Society | Work by mid-career researchers in the field of atomic, molecular, and optical physics |
| United States | Irving Langmuir Award | American Physical Society and American Chemical Society | Interdisciplinary research in chemistry and physics, in the spirit of Irving Langmuir |
| United States | James C. McGroddy Prize for New Materials | American Physical Society | Achievement in the science and application of new materials |
| United States | James Clerk Maxwell Prize for Plasma Physics | American Physical Society | Contributions to the field of plasma physics |
| United States | John H. Dillon Medal | American Physical Society | Outstanding accomplishment and unusual promise in research in polymer physics |
| United States | Joseph F. Keithley Award For Advances in Measurement Science | American Physical Society | Contributions in measurement techniques and equipment |
| United States | Lars Onsager Prize | American Physical Society | Theoretical statistical physics |
| United States | LeRoy Apker Award | American Physical Society | Achievements in physics by undergraduate students |
| United States | Leo Szilard Lectureship Award | American Physical Society | Accomplishments by physicists in promoting the use of physics for the benefit of society |
| United States | Lilienfeld Prize | American Physical Society | Contributions to physics |
| United States | Maria Goeppert-Mayer Award | American Physical Society | Contribution to physics research by a woman |
| United States | Max Delbruck Prize | American Physical Society | Achievement in biological physics research |
| United States | Oliver E. Buckley Condensed Matter Prize | American Physical Society | Theoretical or experimental contributions to condensed matter physics |
| United States | Otto Laporte Award | American Physical Society | Contributions to fluid dynamics (no longer awarded) |
| United States | Panofsky Prize | American Physical Society | Achievements in experimental particle physics |
| United States | Polymer Physics Prize | American Physical Society | Outstanding accomplishment and excellence of contributions in polymer physics research |
| United States | Sakurai Prize | American Physical Society | Achievement in particle physics theory |
| United States | Tom W. Bonner Prize in Nuclear Physics | American Physical Society | Experimental research in nuclear physics, including the development of a method, technique, or device that significantly contributes in a general way to nuclear physics research |
| Canada | CAP-CRM Prize in Theoretical and Mathematical Physics | Canadian Association of Physicists, Centre de Recherches Mathématiques | Research excellence in the fields of theoretical and mathematical physics |
| Canada | J. Tuzo Wilson Medal | Canadian Geophysical Union | Outstanding contribution to the field of geophysics in Canada |
| Canada | John Stewart Bell Prize | University of Toronto | Significant contributions relating to the foundations of quantum mechanics and to the applications of these principles |
| Canada | Rutherford Memorial Medal | Royal Society of Canada | Research in the fields of physics and chemistry |
| Chile | National Prize for Exact Sciences | National Prize of Chile | Scientist whose work in the respective field of knowledge makes him worthy of said distinction |
| United States | ASA Gold Medal | Acoustical Society of America | Outstanding contributions to acoustics |
| United States | ASA Silver Medal | Acoustical Society of America | Contributions to the advancement of science, engineering, or human welfare through the application of acoustic principles or through research accomplishments in acoustics |
| United States | Adolph Lomb Medal | The Optical Society | Young scientists (age 35 or younger) for their contributions to optics |
| United States | Albert Einstein Award | Institute for Advanced Study | High achievement in theoretical physics (no longer awarded) |
| United States | Alexander Hollaender Award in Biophysics | National Academy of Sciences | Outstanding contributions in biophysics |
| United States | Andrew Gemant Award | American Institute of Physics | Substantial cultural, artistic, or humanistic contributions to physics |
| United States | Arctowski Medal | National Academy of Sciences | Studies in solar physics and solar-terrestrial relationships |
| United States | Barnard Medal for Meritorious Service to Science | National Academy of Sciences | Meritorious service to science |
| United States | Bingham Medal | Society of Rheology | Outstanding contributions to the field of rheology |
| United States | Charles Hard Townes Award | The Optical Society | Quantum optics, the physics of lasers |
| United States | Comstock Prize in Physics | National Academy of Sciences | Discovery or investigation in electricity, magnetism, or radiant energy, broadly interpreted |
| United States | Dannie Heineman Prize for Astrophysics | American Astronomical Society and the American Institute of Physics | Work in astrophysics |
| United States | David Richardson Medal | The Optical Society | Contributions to optical engineering, primarily in the commercial and industrial sector |
| United States | Edward Teller Award | American Nuclear Society | Pioneering research and leadership in the use of laser and ion-particle beams to produce unique high-temperature and high-density matter for scientific research and for controlled thermonuclear fusion |
| United States | Edwin H. Land Medal | The Optical Society | Pioneering work empowered by scientific research to create inventions, technologies, and products in optics and imaging |
| United States | Einstein Prize for Laser Science | Society for Optical and Quantum Electronics | Significant contributions in quantum optics (no longer awarded) |
| United States | Elliott Cresson Medal | Franklin Institute | Some discovery in the arts and sciences, or for the invention or improvement of some useful machine, or for some new process or combination of materials in manufactures, or for ingenuity skill or perfection in workmanship (now the Benjamin Franklin Medal) |
| United States | Ellis R. Lippincott Award | The Optical Society | Significant contributions to vibrational spectroscopy as judged by his or her influence on other scientists |
| United States | Esther Hoffman Beller Medal | The Optical Society | Contributions by individuals around the world to the fields of optical science and engineering education |
| United States | Feynman Prize in Nanotechnology | Foresight Institute | Significant advances in nanotechnology |
| United States | Frederic Ives Medal | The Optical Society | Distinction in optics |
| United States | Günther Laukien Prize | Bruker | Recent cutting-edge experimental NMR research with a high probability of enabling beneficial new applications |
| United States | Harold Brown Award | United States Air Force | Scientific research to solve a problem critical to the needs of the Air Force |
| United States | Henry Draper Medal – astrophysics | National Academy of Sciences | Investigations in astronomical physics |
| United States | I. I. Rabi Award | Institute of Electrical and Electronics Engineers | Outstanding contributions related to the fields of atomic and molecular frequency standards, and time transfer and dissemination |
| United States | IEEE Heinrich Hertz Medal | Institute of Electrical and Electronics Engineers | No longer awarded |
| United States | J. Robert Oppenheimer Memorial Prize | Center for Theoretical Studies, University of Miami | Outstanding contributions to the theoretical natural sciences |
| United States | John Price Wetherill Medal | Franklin Institute | Discovery or invention in the physical sciences, or new and important combinations of principles or methods already known |
| United States | John Tyndall Award | The Optical Society | Pioneering, highly significant, or continuing technical or leadership contributions to fiber optics technology |
| United States | Klopsteg Memorial Award | American Association of Physics Teachers | Notable physicist |
| United States | Max Born Award | The Optical Society | Outstanding contributions to physical optics |
| United States | Medard W. Welch Award | American Vacuum Society | research in the fields pertinent to American Vacuum Society |
| United States | Oersted Medal | American Association of Physics Teachers | Notable contributions to the teaching of physics |
| United States | Paul F. Forman Team Engineering Excellence Award | The Optical Society | Technical achievements in optical engineering and contributions to society such as engineering education |
| United States | Peter Mark Memorial award | American Vacuum Society | Outstanding theoretical or experimental work by a young scientist or engineer |
| United States | Quantum Electronics Award | IEEE Photonics Society | Outstanding contributions to quantum electronics, in either or both of the fields of fundamental research or application |
| United States | R. W. Wood Prize | The Optical Society | Technical contribution or an invention in the field of optics |
| United States | Richtmyer Memorial Award | American Association of Physics Teachers | Physics education |
| United States | Robert A. Millikan award | American Association of Physics Teachers | Notable contributions to the teaching of physics |
| United States | Rumford Prize | American Academy of Arts and Sciences | Contributions by scientists to the fields of heat and light |
| United States | Russell Varian Prize | Agilent Technologies | Single, high-impact and innovative contribution in the field of nuclear magnetic resonance |
| United States | Sloan Research Fellowship | Alfred P. Sloan Foundation | Early-career scientists and scholars |
| United States | Wallace Clement Sabine Medal | Acoustical Society of America | Individual of any nationality who has advanced the science of architectural acoustics |
| United States | William F. Meggers Award in Spectroscopy | The Optical Society | Contributions to spectroscopy |

== Asia ==
| Country | Award | Sponsor | Notes |
|---|---|---|---|
| China | Future Science Prize for physical science | Future Forum | Outstanding contributions in physics, awarded to the physical-science related basis and applied research |
| Hong Kong | Shaw Prize | Shaw Prize Foundation | Outstanding contributions in astronomy, life science and medicine, and mathematical sciences |
| India | Aryabhata Award | Astronautical Society of India | Individuals with notable lifetime contributions in the field of astronautics and aerospace technology in India |
| India | Infosys Prize in Physical Sciences | Infosys Science Foundation | Awards outstanding achievements of contemporary researchers and scientists across six categories, including Physical Sciences |
| India | Shanti Swarup Bhatnagar Prize for Science and Technology | Council of Scientific and Industrial Research | For notable and outstanding research, applied or fundamental, in biology, chemistry, environmental science, engineering, mathematics, medicine and physics |
| India | Kotcherlakota Rangadhama Rao Memorial Lecture Award | Indian National Science Academy | Outstanding contributions in the subject of spectroscopy in physics |
| India | Om Prakash Bhasin Award | Shri Om Prakash Bhasin Foundation | Excellence in the areas of science and technology |
| India | VASVIK Industrial Research Award | VASVIK | Excellence in industrial research in the areas of science and technology |
| Israel | Sackler Prize | Tel Aviv University | Prize in the disciplines of either physics or chemistry |
| Israel | Wolf Prize in Physics | Wolf Foundation | Physics |
| Japan | Heinrich Rohrer Medal | Surface Science Society of Japan | Achievements in the field of nanoscience and nanotechnology based on surface science |
| Japan | Nishina Memorial Prize | Nishina Memorial Foundation | Substantial contributions in the field of physics |
| Japan | Sir Martin Wood Prize | Oxford Instruments | Awarded annually to a scientist younger than 45 who has achieved remarkable results in condensed matter science at a university or research institute in Japan. Condensed matter science includes condensed matter physics, inorganic-organic chemistry, material science and surface-interface physics. |
| Pakistan | Abdus Salam Award | International Centre for Theoretical Physics Pakistan chapter | Chemistry, mathematics, physics, biology scientists who are resident in Pakistan, below 35 years of age |

== Europe ==
| Country | Award | Sponsor | Notes |
|---|---|---|---|
| Europe | Becquerel Prize | European Commission | Scientific, technical or managerial merits in the field of photovoltaic solar energy |
| Europe | EPS Europhysics Prize | European Physical Society | Scientific excellence in the area of condensed matter physics |
| Europe | EPS Statistical and Nonlinear Physics Prize | European Physical Society | Research contributions in the area of statistical physics, nonlinear physics, complex systems, and complex networks |
| Europe | Edison Volta Prize | European Physical Society | Achievements in physics |
| Europe | Gribov Medal | European Physical Society | Work in theoretical elementary particle physics or quantum field theory |
| Europe | Hannes Alfvén Prize | European Physical Society | Achievements which have shaped the plasma physics field or are expected to do so in future |
| Europe | High Energy and Particle Physics Prize | European Physical Society | Outstanding contribution to high energy and particle physics |
| Europe | Lise Meitner Prize | European Physical Society | Outstanding work in the fields of experimental, theoretical or applied nuclear science |
| Europe | Louis Néel Medal | European Geophysical Society | Outstanding contributions in the application of experimental and theoretical methods of solid state physics to the study of earth sciences |
| Austria | Haitinger Prize | Austrian Academy of Sciences | Studies in chemistry and physics that proved to be of great practical use for industrial applications |
| Austria | Lieben Prize | Austrian Academy of Sciences | Young scientists working in the fields of molecular biology, chemistry, or physics |
| Austria | Ludwig Boltzmann Prize | Austrian Physical Society | Outstanding achievements in theoretical physics |
| Denmark | H. C. Ørsted Medal | Society for the Dissemination of Natural Science | Scientific work in physics or chemistry |
| Denmark | Niels Bohr Institute Medal of Honour | Niels Bohr Institute | Particularly outstanding researcher who is working in the spirit of Niels Bohr: international cooperation and the exchange of knowledge |
| Denmark | Niels Bohr International Gold Medal | Danish Society of Engineers, Niels Bohr Institute, Royal Danish Academy of Sciences and Letters | Engineering award |
| France | Ampère Prize | French Academy of Sciences | Outstanding research work in mathematics or physics |
| France | Jacques Herbrand Prize | French Academy of Sciences | Young researchers (up to 35 years) in the field of mathematics, physics, and their non-military applications |
| France | Leconte Prize | French Academy of Sciences | Important discoveries in mathematics, physics, and biology |
| France | Three Physicists Prize | École normale supérieure | Major contributions in physics |
| France | Volta Prize | Government of France | Extraordinary scientific discoveries related to electricity (no longer awarded) |
| Germany | Berthold Leibinger Innovationspreis | Berthold Leibinger Stiftung | Those who have created applied laser technology and innovations on the application or generation of laser light |
| Germany | Berthold Leibinger Zukunftspreis | Berthold Leibinger Stiftung | Excellent research on the application or generation of laser light |
| Germany | Gottfried Wilhelm Leibniz Prize | Deutsche Forschungsgemeinschaft | Exceptional scientists and academics for their outstanding achievements in the field of research |
| Germany | Heinz Maier-Leibnitz-Preis | German Ministry of Education and Research | Physics |
| Germany | Humboldt Prize | Alexander von Humboldt Foundation | Internationally renowned scientists and scholars who work outside of Germany |
| Germany | Karl Scheel Prize | German Physical Society | Outstanding scientific work |
| Germany | Klung Wilhelmy Science Award | Otto Klung Foundation and the Dr. Wilhelmy Foundation | Younger German scientists under the age of 40 in chemistry or physics |
| Germany/United Kingdom | Max Born Medal and Prize | German Physical Society and Institute of Physics | Outstanding contributions to physics |
| Germany | Max Planck Medal | German Physical Society | Theoretical physics |
| Germany | Otto Hahn Prize | German Chemical Society, German Physical Society and City of Frankfurt | Achievement in the field of chemistry, physics or applied engineering science |
| Germany | Stern–Gerlach Medal | German Physical Society | Experimental physicists |
| Germany | Walter Schottky Prize | German Physical Society | Outstanding research work of young academics in the field of solid-state physics |
| Hungary | International Dennis Gabor Award | Hungarian Academy of Sciences | Scientific achievements with practical applications, with a clear positive attitude towards international cooperation of the researchers |
| Italy | Alfredo di Braccio Award | Accademia dei Lincei | Top young chemist or physicist |
| Italy | Enrico Fermi Prize | Italian Physical Society | Members of the society who have particularly honored physics with their discoveries |
| Italy | Galileo Galilei Medal | Istituto Nazionale di Fisica Nucleare | For outstanding results in the areas of theoretical physics of interest to INFN |
| Italy | Majorana Prize | Electronic Journal of Theoretical Physics | Outstanding contributions to theoretical and mathematical physics |
| Italy | Matteucci Medal | Accademia nazionale delle scienze | Physicists for their fundamental contributions |
| Italy | Tomassoni awards | Sapienza University of Rome | Achievements in physics |
| Netherlands | Lorentz Medal | Royal Netherlands Academy of Arts and Sciences | Physics |
| Poland | First Step to Nobel Prize in Physics | Organizing Committee | Competition for high school students |
| Poland | Marian Smoluchowski Medal | Polish Physical Society | Significant contributions in physics |
| Russia | Bogolyubov Prize for young scientists | Joint Institute for Nuclear Research | Young researchers in theoretical physics |
| Russia | Bogolyubov Prize | Joint Institute for Nuclear Research | Outstanding contribution to theoretical physics and applied mathematics |
| Russia | Bruno Pontecorvo Prize | Joint Institute for Nuclear Research | Elementary particle physics |
| Russia | Demidov Prize | Russian Academy of Sciences | Achievements in natural sciences and humanities |
| Russia | Friedmann Prize | Russian Academy of Sciences | Work in cosmology and gravity |
| Russia | Landau Gold Medal | Russian Academy of Sciences | Theoretical physics |
| Russia | Pomeranchuk Prize | Institute for Theoretical and Experimental Physics | Theoretical physics |
| Soviet Union | Kurchatov Medal | USSR Academy of Sciences | Outstanding achievements in nuclear physics and in the field of nuclear energy |
| Sweden | Gregori Aminoff Prize | Royal Swedish Academy of Sciences | Individual contribution in the field of crystallography, including areas concerned with the dynamics of the formation and dissolution of crystal structures |
| Sweden | Lise Meitner Distinguished Lecture | Royal Swedish Academy of Sciences | Physics |
| Sweden | Nobel Prize in Physics | Royal Swedish Academy of Sciences | Outstanding contributions for mankind in the field of physics |
| Sweden | Oskar Klein Memorial Lecture | Stockholm University/Royal Swedish Academy of Sciences | Prominent physicist |
| Switzerland | Albert Einstein Medal | Albert Einstein Society | Scientific findings, works, or publications related to Einstein |
| Switzerland | Tomalla Prize | Tomalla Foundation | Research in gravitation and/or cosmology |
| Ukraine | Bogolyubov Prize | National Academy of Sciences of Ukraine | Outstanding contribution to theoretical physics and applied mathematics |
| United Kingdom | A B Wood Medal | Institute of Acoustics | Distinguished contributions to the application of underwater acoustics |
| United Kingdom | Copley Medal | Royal Society | Achievements in research in any branch of science |
| United Kingdom | Eddington Medal | Royal Astronomical Society | Investigations of outstanding merit in theoretical astrophysics |
| United Kingdom | Hughes Medal | Royal Society | Electricity and magnetism |
| United Kingdom | R W B Stephens Medal | Institute of Acoustics | Contributions to acoustics research or education |
| United Kingdom | Rayleigh Medal | Institute of Acoustics | Outstanding contributions to acoustics |
| United Kingdom | Rumford Medal | Royal Society | Important recent discovery in the field of thermal or optical properties of matter made by a scientist working in Europe |
| United Kingdom | Tyndall Medal | Institute of Acoustics | Achievement and services in the field of acoustics |
| United Kingdom | Clifford Paterson Medal and Prize | Institute of Physics | Exceptional early career contributions to the application of physics |
| United Kingdom | Duddell Medal and Prize | Institute of Physics | Application of physics in an industrial, commercial or business context (renamed Gabor Medal and Prize in 2008) |
| United Kingdom | Edward Appleton Medal and Prize | Institute of Physics | Environmental, earth or atmospheric physics |
| United Kingdom | Fernand Holweck Medal and Prize | Institute of Physics | Distinguished work in experimental physics or in theoretical physics which is closely related to experimentation (awarded with Société Française de Physique) |
| United Kingdom | Fred Hoyle Medal and Prize | Institute of Physics | Distinguished contributions to astrophysics, gravitational physics or cosmology |
| United Kingdom | Gabor Medal and Prize | Institute of Physics | Distinguished contributions to the application of physics in an industrial, commercial or business context |
| United Kingdom | Harrie Massey Medal and Prize | Institute of Physics | Contributions to physics or its applications (Awarded with Australian Institute of Physics) |
| United Kingdom | Isaac Newton Medal | Institute of Physics | Contributions to physics |
| United Kingdom | Joseph Thomson Medal and Prize | Institute of Physics | Distinguished research in atomic physics (including quantum optics) or molecular physics |
| United Kingdom | Michael Faraday Medal and Prize | Institute of Physics | Sustained contributions to experimental physics |
| United Kingdom | James Chadwick Medal and Prize | Institute of Physics | Distinguished contributions to particle physics |
| United Kingdom | James Clerk Maxwell Medal and Prize | Institute of Physics | Outstanding early-career contributions to theoretical physics |
| United Kingdom | James Joule Medal and Prize | Institute of Physics | Distinguished contributions to applied physics |
| United Kingdom | Katharine Burr Blodgett Medal and Prize | Institute of Physics | Organisation or application of physics in an industrial or commercial context |
| United Kingdom | Kelvin Prize | Institute of Physics | Promoting public awareness of the place of physics in the world, of its contributions to the quality of life and its advancement of an understanding of the physical world and the place of humanity within it |
| United Kingdom | Nevill Mott Medal and Prize | Institute of Physics | Distinguished contributions to condensed matter physics |
| United Kingdom | Occhialini Prize | Institute of Physics | Physicists who work in Italy (even dated years) or the UK or Ireland (odd dated years) (with the Italian Physical Society) |
| United Kingdom | Paul Dirac Medal and Prize | Institute of Physics | Sustained contributions to theoretical (including mathematical and computational) physics |
| United Kingdom | Phillips Award | Institute of Physics | Distinguished service to the Institute of Physics |
| United Kingdom | President's Medal of the IOP | Institute of Physics | Meritorious services in various fields of endeavour which were of benefit to physics in general and the Institute in particular |
| United Kingdom | Rayleigh Medal | Institute of Physics | Distinguished research in theoretical, mathematical or computational physics |
| United Kingdom | Richard Glazebrook Medal and Prize | Institute of Physics | Sustained contributions to leadership in a physics context |
| United Kingdom | Rutherford Medal and Prize | Institute of Physics | Research in nuclear physics or nuclear technology |
| United Kingdom | Simon Memorial Prize | Institute of Physics | Distinguished work in experimental or theoretical low temperature physics |
| United Kingdom | Thomas Young Medal and Prize | Institute of Physics | Distinguished research in the field of optics, including physics outside the visible region |

== Oceania ==
| Country | Award | Sponsor | Notes |
|---|---|---|---|
| Australia | Barry Inglis Medal | National Measurement Institute, Australia | Leadership, research and/or applications of measurement techniques |
| Australia | Dirac Medal and Lecture | University of New South Wales | Advancement of theoretical physics |
| Australia | Pawsey Medal | Australian Academy of Science | Outstanding research in the field of physics by an Australian scientist under 40 years of age |
| Australia | Phillip Law Postdoctoral Award for the Physical Sciences | Royal Society of Victoria | Excellence in scientific research by an early career researcher in the physical sciences |
| Australia | Thomas Ranken Lyle Medal | Australian Academy of Science | Mathematician or physicist for his or her outstanding research accomplishments |
| Australia | Walter Boas Medal | Australian Institute of Physics | Research in physics in Australia |
| New Zealand | Hector Medal | Royal Society Te Apārangi | Work of great scientific or technological merit and an outstanding contribution to the advancement of the particular branch of science |
| New Zealand | Rutherford Medal | Royal Society of New Zealand | Exceptional contributions and eminent research or technological practice by a person or group in any field of science, mathematics, social science, or technology |

== See also ==
- Lists of awards
- Lists of science and technology awards
