= European Conference on Underwater Acoustics =

The European Conference on Underwater Acoustics (ECUA) was a conference on underwater acoustics that took place in Europe every two years, until 2012, when it was held in Edinburgh (Scotland), and organized by the Institute of Acoustics. Previous editions took place in Delft (Netherlands, 2004), Algarve, (Portugal, 2006) and Paris (France, 2008) and Istanbul (Turkey, 2010).
