= Salford Acoustics =

Coordinates: 53°29′10″N 2°16′24″W

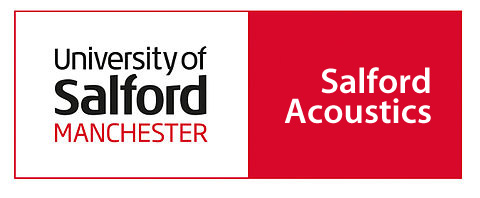
- Motto: Altiora Petamus "Let us seek higher things"
- Type: Department, public university
- Established: 1965
- Affiliations: University of Salford
- Location: Salford, Greater Manchester, England
- Campus: Urban, Parkland
- Colours: Red, Black and White
- Website: http://www.acoustics.salford.ac.uk/

Salford Acoustics offers acoustics and audio engineering courses undertakes public and industrial research in acoustics, carries out commercial testing and undertakes activities to engage the public in acoustic science and engineering. It is based in two locations: (i) 3 km west of Manchester city centre, UK, in the Newton Building on the Peel Park Campus of the University of Salford, and (ii) on the banks of the Manchester Ship Canal in Manchester at MediaCityUK.

== History and current structure ==
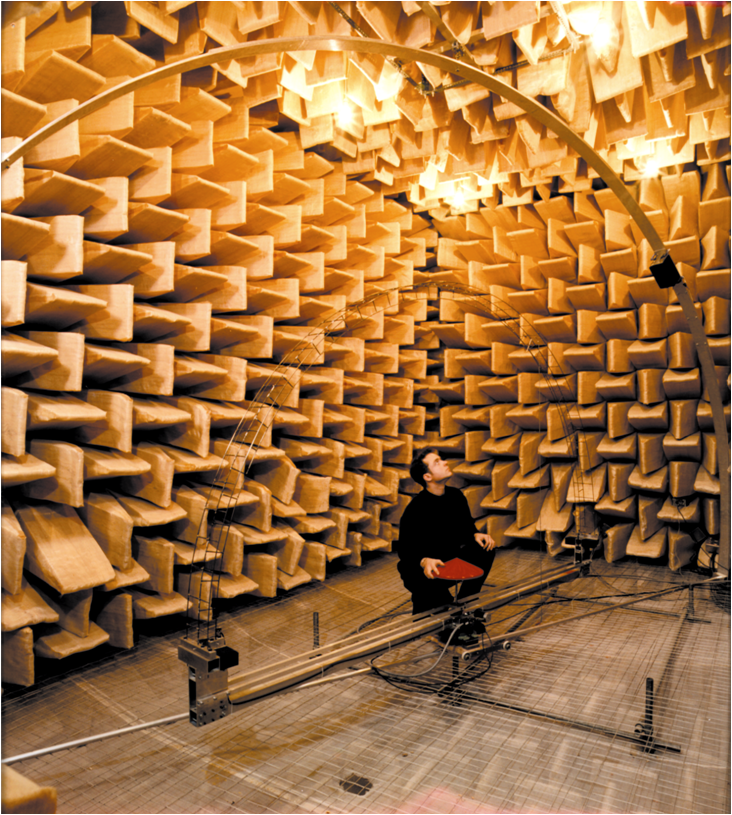
The second anechoic chamber at University of Salford

The first acoustic laboratories were established in Salford in 1965; in the early 1970s the Department of Applied Acoustics was formed. In 1996 the university merged with University College Salford and a Department of Acoustic and Audio Engineering was formed. A couple of years later, this joined with another department to form Acoustic and Electronic Engineering. Finally, the university twice reduced the number of schools in the organisation. Salford Acoustics first joined the School of Computing, Science and Engineering and later this was merged into the School of Science, Engineering and Environment. Research work comes under the auspices of the Acoustics Research Centre.

== Programmes ==
The Department of Applied Acoustics first taught an undergraduate degree in 1975, namely the BSc (Hons) in Electroacoustics. This was later renamed Beng (Hons) Acoustics. In 1993, Salford Acoustics set up the BEng (Hons) in Audio Technology. These two undergraduate degrees are now taught under a single banner, BEng Audio Acoustics, with two pathways to represent the different interests of the cohort. Salford acoustics has also taught masters in acoustic engineering and audio for many decades, currently offering an MSc in Audio Acoustics and an MSc in Environmental Acoustics. The Acoustics Research Centre offers masters and doctoral research degrees.

== Research ==
=== Rating ===
In REF2021, the feedback from the Engineering Panel (UoA12) noted, ‘outstanding impact demonstrated … live sports audio’. The Acoustics Research Centre achieved the top research rating of 6* in RAE 2001 as part of the Research Institute for the Built and Human Environment's submission to Unit Of Assessment 30, Architecture and the Built Environment. In 2008, the RAE submission including the Acoustics Research Centre finished top of Research Fortnight’s ‘Research Power’ table for Architecture & the Built Environment. 90% of the research was graded at international standard and 25% at world-leading.

=== Sub-disciplines ===
Research is carried out in the following sub-disciplines of acoustic engineering and science

- Archaeoacoustics
- Architectural and building acoustics
- Audio signal processing
- Auralization
- Electroacoustics
- Environmental noise
- Noise control
- Outdoor sound propagation
- Psychoacoustics
- Remote sensing using sound
- Sound reproduction
- Soundscapes
- Surround sound systems
- Vibration and dynamics

== Public engagement ==
Breaking glass with sound shot by Salford Acoustics and used in curriculum materials for schools

Examples of public engagement work include:

- The search for the Worst Sound in the World. Engineering and Physical Sciences Research Council GrantRef:EP/D000068/1.
- Development of extensive curriculum materials on physics and acoustics for schools (EPSRC GrantRefs:GR/S23919/01, EP/D507030/1, P/D054729/1, EP/E033806/1, EP/G020116/1)
- The search for the Sonic Wonders of the World

== Laboratories ==
Most of Salford's Acoustics and Audio Laboratories are based on the Peel Park campus, but some are at MediaCityUK:

- Audio production suites
- Radio studios
- Recording studios
- Anechoic chamber
- 2x Semi-anechoic chambers
- Reverberation chamber
- Transmission suite
- Listening room

== Commercial work ==
Salford Acoustics is a calibration and test house for construction, government, military, audio R&D and the motor industry.

== Current staff ==
=== Awards ===
Person	Award	Year
Prof Jamie Angus	Audio Engineering Society Gold Medal	2023
Dr Joshua Meggitt	Institute of Acoustics Tyndall Medal	2023
Prof Jamie Angus	Audio Engineering Society Silver Medal	2019
Dr Jon Hargreaves	Institute of Acoustics Tyndall Medal	2016
Professor Yiu Wai Lam	Institute of Acoustics Rayleigh Medal	2012
Dr Olga Umnova	Institute of Acoustics Tyndall Medal	2010
Trevor Cox	Institute of Acoustics Promoting Acoustics to the Public	2009
Prof Jamie Angus	Institute of Acoustics Peter Barnett Award	2004
Trevor Cox	Institute of Acoustics Tyndall Medal	2004
Dr Francis Li	Institute of Acoustics Peter Barnett memorial student award	2003

=== Notable staff ===
- Trevor Cox, (Professor of Acoustic Engineering and Broadcaster)
- Olga Umnova

== Alumni and Former Staff ==
The following past members of Salford Acoustics have been President of the Institute of Acoustics:

Person	Dates
Professor Peter Lord	1978-80
Professor Peter Wheeler	1992-94
Geoff Kerry	2002-04
Dr Tony Jones	2004-06
Professor Trevor Cox	2010-12
Jo Webb	2016-18
David Waddington	2024-26

- Teli Chinelis, Acoustician and Expert Witness with Finch Consulting Ltd,
- Theo Hutchcraft, Hurts
- Dr Guy Nicholson, Applications Manager at Apple
- Tom Wrigglesworth, stand-up comedian
- Nick Zacharov, co-author of Perceptual Audio Evaluation
- Velma Allen, Director, Technical Publications at Citrix Systems
- Mark Bailey, Director of Sales, EMEA, at QSC Audio Products, LLC
- Asa Beattie, Senior Engineer at Technicolor
- Tony Churnside, Creative Technologist at BBC, Technical. Director at The Radiophonic Workshop
- Kelvin Griffiths, Company Director at Electroacoustic Design Ltd
- Ian Bromilow, Principal at Vanguardia Consulting
- Rachel Canham, Director, WBM Acoustic Consultants
- Chris Chittock, managing director at Dragonfly Acoustics Ltd
- Richard Collman, managing director at Acoustical Control Engineers Ltd
- Matt Desborough, Director, Content Services (EMEA) at Dolby Laboratories
- Chris Dilworth, Director (Acoustics) at AWN Consulting
- Matthew Dore, Senior Manager, Sound and Acoustics at Philips Consumer Lifestyle
- Ian Etchells, Principal Consultant at Red Acoustics Limited
- Matthew Hyden, Principal Consultant at Temple Group
- Daniel Goodhand, Owner of Goodhand Acoustics
- Dr Tony Jones, managing director AIRO
- Sam Liston, Director at F1 Sound Company Limited
- Paul Malpas, Director at Engineered Acoustic Design Ltd
- Andrew Marchant, Principal Engineer at HiWave Technologies plc
- Richard Metcalfe, Global Product Line Management at Harman Consumer Group International
- Rick Methold, Director at Southdowns Environmental - Consultants in Acoustics, Noise and Vibration
- Robert Miller, Director at F1 Acoustics Company Limited
- Derek Nash, managing director at Acoustics Central
- Chris Needham, Senior Software Engineer at BBC Research and Development
- Rohan Ramadorai, Associate at WSP Limited
- Andrew Parkin, Acoustics Partner at Cundall
- Richard Perkins, Technical Director - Acoustics at PB
- Martin Raisborough, Technical Director at WSP Group
- Russell Richardson, Director at RBA Acoustics
- Darren Rose, Senior R&D Specialist, Electronics at Genelec Oy
- Mark Scaife, Head of Acoustics - Middle East at WSP Group
- Richard Sherwood, Director at Sound Reduction Systems Ltd
- Simon Shilton, Director, Acustica Ltd
- Vicky Stewart, Principal Acoustician at Atkins
- Martin Stone, Senior Software Engineer at the BBC
- Timo Esser, Principal Audio Engineer at Alpine Electronics Europe GmbH
- Phil Stollery, Global Product Marketing Manager at Brüel & Kjær,
- Tim Stubbs, managing director at PCB Piezotronics
- Ryan Swales, Director at RS Acoustic Engineering Ltd
- James Trow, associate director at AMEC Environment and Infrastructure UK Ltd
- Susan Witterick, Director at dBx Acoustics Limited

== See also ==
- University of Salford
