= A B Wood Medal =

The A B Wood Medal is a prize awarded annually by the Institute of Acoustics for "distinguished contributions to the application of underwater acoustics". The prize, named after Albert Beaumont Wood, is presented in alternate years to European and North American scientists.

== Recipients ==
Source: Institute of Acoustics

- B. S. McCartney (1970)
- Robert E. Apfel (1971)
- B. Ray (1972)
- M. C. Hendershott (1973)
- Paul A. Crowther (1976)
- Peter R. Stephanishen (1977)
- Anthony D. Hawkins (1978)
- Peter H. Rogers (1979)
- Ian Roebuck (1980)
- Robert C. Spindel (1981)
- Michael J. Buckingham (1982)
- Peter N. Mikhalevsky (1983)
- Martin J. Earwicker (1984)
- Timothy K. Stanton (1985)
- Peter D. Thorne (1986)
- David M. F. Chapman (1987)
- Victor F. Humphrey (1988)
- M. G. Brown (1989)
- Ann P. Dowling (1990)
- Michael B. Porter (1991)
- Christopher H. Harrison (1992)
- Michael D. Collins (1993)
- Timothy G. Leighton (1994)
- Nicholas C. Makris (1995)
- Grant B. Deane (1997)
- Michael A. Ainslie (1998)
- Mark V. Trevorrow (1999)
- Gary J. Heald (2000)
- John A. Colosi (2001)
- Simon Richards (2002)
- Anthony Lyons (2003)
- Eric Pouliquen (2004)
- Aaron B. Thode (2005)
- Preston S. Wilson (2007)
- Judith Bell (2008)
- Karim Sabra (2009)
- Mario Zampolli (2010)
- Kyle Becker (2011)
- John Smith (2012)
- Brian Todd Hefner (2013)
- Alexander von Benda-Beckmann (2014)
- Ying-Tsong Lin (2015)
- Yan Pailhas (2016)
- Jan Dettmer (2017)
- Nathan Merchant (2018)
- Julien Bonnel (2019)
- Louise Roberts (2020)
- Megan Ballard (2021)
- Sophie Nedelec (2022)
- David Barclay (2023)
- Özkan Sertlek (2024)

== See also ==
- List of physics awards
