= R W B Stephens Medal =

Prize from the Institute of Acoustics

The R W B Stephens Medal is a prize from the Institute of Acoustics named after Dr Ray Stephens, the first President of the Institute of Acoustics. His main interests lay in physical acoustics but he is remembered by generations of students for his continuing work in education. The medal is awarded in odd-numbered years for outstanding contributions to acoustics research or education.

== List of recipients ==
Source: Institute of Acoustics

- 1994 Jens Peter Blauert
- 1995 Andrés Lara-Saenz
- 1997 Robert C Chivers
- 1999 David C Hothersall
- 2001 Dr Geoff Leventhal
- 2003 Prof Greg R. Watts
- 2005 Prof Michael Vorländer
- 2007 Prof Michael Griffin
- 2009 Prof Timothy Leighton
- 2011 Prof Bridget Shield
- 2013 Dr Robert Peters
- 2019 Raf Orlowski

== See also ==
- List of physics awards
