= Electric Dreams (2009 TV series) =

BBC television documentary series

- Electric Dreams title card
- Genre: Documentary/Reality
- Written by: Stuart Elliott/Peter Sweasey
- Directed by: Stuart Elliott/Peter Sweasey
- Starring: Sullivan-Barnes Family; Tom Wrigglesworth; Gia Milinovich; Dr Ben Highmore
- Narrated by: Robert Llewellyn
- Opening theme: Together in Electric Dreams
- Countries of origin: United Kingdom and Australia
- Original language: English
- No. of series: 1
- No. of episodes: 3

Production
- Running time: 60 mins

Original release
- Network: BBC Four
- Release: 29 September – 13 October 2009

Electric Dreams is a BBC television documentary series, co-produced with The Open University, that places a family of two parents and four children in their home with only the amenities available during each of the previous three decades (1970s, 1980s and 1990s), and recording their responses to the changing pace of technological change. The intent of the series was to be "much more than a technology show … it is contemporary social history and asks big moral questions about life in the modern world". Narrated by actor and comedian Robert Llewellyn, the series first aired on the UK digital terrestrial channel BBC Four in September and October 2009. It was later sold for international broadcast in 2010 and 2011.

== Background ==
There are three episodes; "The 1970s", "The 1980s" and "The 1990s". Each covers a period of ten days, one for each year, with a counter over the front door showing the current year. New devices and amenities - as well as clothing and interior designs - are provided as appropriate as days go by (for example, a home computer in 1982, and a VCR in 1984), and sometimes removed as they go out of date. The programme follows the family's adaption and reaction to being thrown back in time to a more technologically sparse period; and how their pastimes, social interactions and attitudes change in response to both landing in the early 1970s and coming up-to-date. They are not kept isolated "Big Brother" style over the course of the series; instead life continues "normally" - the parents go to work, children to school, friends come over, videos are (only just) rented, and dinner parties held. The series concludes with the family hosting their own Millennium party (to the children's initial confusion) with friends and neighbours in attendance. Their general opinion is one of relief to be returned to the 21st century and its more widely electronically connected society, but that some lessons have been learned from the past on how making more time for family togetherness actually made them happier than their previously quite personally insular existence.

=== Guests ===
Guests appearing on the show included Sir Clive Sinclair, members of Ultravox, Simon Munnery, Patrick Bossert and Keith Stewart of The Guardian, a gaming journalist and Simon Webb, curator of the Museum of Computing in Swindon. Although cut from the final version, Jason Fitzpatrick of The Centre for Computing History was also interviewed about the Altair 8800 computer. Many of the gadgets used in the documentary were supplied by the museum.

== Inception and production ==
The program was produced by Wall to Wall, an independent UK production company with a long track record of educational reality programming, including The 1900 House (1999), Who Do You Think You Are?. (2004–present), and Man on Wire, winner of an Academy Award for Best Documentary Feature (2008). Wall to Wall was jointly commissioned by the BBC and the Open University to produce the series in early 2009. Mark Ball, Commissioning Editor of the BBC said at the time, "It will be much more than a technology show … it is contemporary social history and asks big moral questions about life in the modern world".

The Sullivan-Barnes family was selected to appear after they responded to a letter sent to their son's school by the producers of the program. The Sullivan-Barneses are a blended family, father Adam Barnes and his daughter Steffi (age 12 at the time of filming), mother Georgie Sullivan and her two children, Hamish (13) and Ellie (12), and their son together Jude, age 2, Mr. Barnes an accountant with BP and his wife a manager with the NHS. Adam Barnes said he was drawn to the project because of the chance of being reintroduced to the technologies that interested him as a youth and, as he said to an interviewer afterwards, "the chance to ride classic cars". Filming occurred over the winter of 2009, which was particularly cold and snowy for England, a fact which figured into the story when the family had to endure cold nights early in the project when the lack of central heating was simulated for the 70s episode. The house was renovated before each "decade" to reflect the design styles of each era. While these renovations were being completed, the family lived in a cottage nearby.

Technologies and styles featured in each program
	1970s	1980s	1990s	2009
Decor	1970s in furniture	Laura Ashley	n/a	n/a
Clothing	1970s in fashion	1980s in fashion	1990s in fashion	2000s in fashion
Transport	Cortina Mark II; Raleigh Chopper; Space hopper	Escort 1.3l Sinclair C5	Toyota Town Ace	Land Rover Discovery
Kitchen and Appliances	Teasmade; Twin tub washer Freezer; Toaster; Atora brand lard Bejam	Microwave oven Deep fat fryer Slow cooker	Water filter AGA cooker Breadmaker (1998)	not stated
Communication	Rotary dial telephone	Ansaphone	Motorola International 3200; Dial-up 56k modem (1997); Nokia SMS; Pay-as-you-go Mobile phone (1998); Text messaging (1998)	mobile phones (5); Internet
Toys and Gadgets	Atari Pong; Hand held calculator Black and white TV; Colour TV (1976); LP records Cassette tapes KerPlunk; Binatone (8-bit computer)	Polaroid instant camera Component stereo Compact disc player VHS camera VHS recorder Hand held games Amstrad CPC; Simon; Betamax; ZX Spectrum; Commodore 64; Sony Walkman; BBC Micro; Remote controller Synthesizer; Rubik's Cube	Super Nintendo Entertainment System; Mega Drive (1990); Game Boy; Game Gear; Windows 3.1 OS (1992); Oxford Children's Encyclopedia on CD-ROM; Apple QuickTake 100 (1994); Windows 95 OS; PlayStation (PS1) (1995); Tamagotchi (1996); Laptop computer Palm Pilot; Karaoke machine (1999)	games consoles (3); DVD players (3) televisions (6) computers (7)

== Reviews ==
The Guardian's Kathryn Flett said that it was "warm, funny and done with impeccable attention to detail". Meanwhile, the television critic for The Telegraph found the reality show premise predictable, saying, "the programme carefully followed the formula laid down in the Ancient Texts. The mother, Georgie, gave a wistful sigh and said she hoped they would get to 'spend more time together as a family', the narrator threatened to rupture himself with mirth as the Sullivan-Barneses walked towards their home – 'They have no idea what lies behind their front door!' – and the children duly emitted shrieks of delight upon seeing that the house had been transformed into something that even Dave Hill from Slade might have blanched at".

TeamTeaBag found Electric Dreams "an enjoyable mini-series" but that "the 'reality' side of it didn't really fit well with the technological exploration. More attention could have been paid to the technology itself as any reaction is of secondary importance". Conversely, TV Throng called it "gadget porn", as it dwelled more on the technologies than on the family's reactions.

== International broadcasts ==
Despite its UK focus that sometimes featured products not marketed in other parts of the world, such as the C5 and Teasmade, the series proved salable in other markets. The programme was seen in Asia on History Channel in late January 2010 and on Knowledge, the British Columbia public educational broadcaster, which aired the series weekly beginning on 6 October 2010. In Australia the series was broadcast by Channel Ten and narrated by Amanda Keller. Much of the music used throughout the show on the BBC airing, including the main theme by Philip Oakey "Together in Electric Dreams", were removed from foreign airings presumably due to licensing and copyright reasons. Episodes were edited and shortened due to advertising on the Australian showing.

In the US, the series was purchased for broadcast by PBS early in 2011 as part of a large purchase of more than 200 programming hours negotiated by BBC Showcase Syndication, the US marketing wing of the BBC. WGBH of Boston aired the program in April 2011.

In France, Encyclo broadcast the show in 2012 dubbed in French.

In Italy, the Rai (National Broadcast Company) broadcast the show in 2014 dubbed in Italian, on the educational channel Rai Scuola.

== Episodes ==
Episode	Original air date	PBS air date
1970s	29 September 2009	13 April 2011
1980s	6 October 2009	20 April 2011
1990s	13 October 2009	27 April 2011
