= Kirill Horoshenkov =

Russian acoustic engineer

Kirill Horoshenkov FREng (Russian: Кирилл Вячеславович Хорошенков) is a Russian-born British academic and professor at the University of Sheffield. He is an expert in outdoor sound propagation, acoustic materials and instrumentation. In recognition of his contribution to the field of acoustics, he was awarded the Tyndall Medal by the Institute of Acoustics in 2006. He was elected a fellow of the Acoustical Society of America in 2014 and fellow of the Royal Academy of Engineering in 2020.

Horoshenkov holds a degree in acoustics and ultrasonic engineering from Moscow State Institute of Radio-engineering Electronics and Automation (1989) and a PhD in acoustics from the University of Bradford (1997). He was an academic at the University of Bradford from 1995–2013 and currently holds the position of professor of Acoustics at Sheffield.

He has been involved actively in the professional life of the acoustic community in the UK and overseas, serving as a member of the Engineering Division Committee of the Institute of Acoustics, member of the Engineering and Physical Sciences Research Council (EPSRC) Peer Review College, associate editor of the Journal of the Acoustical Society of America, Journal of Applied Acoustics and the Journal of Acta Acustica (United with Acustica). He has authored/co-authored two books, over 100 journal and conference papers and has successfully submitted four patent applications. He leads the EPSRC-sponsored UK Acoustics Network and Pipebots Programme Grant to develop an autonomous inspection technology for underground pipes.
