= Inchindown oil tanks =

Disused oil depot in Scotland

Coordinates: 57°44′26″N 4°12′17″W

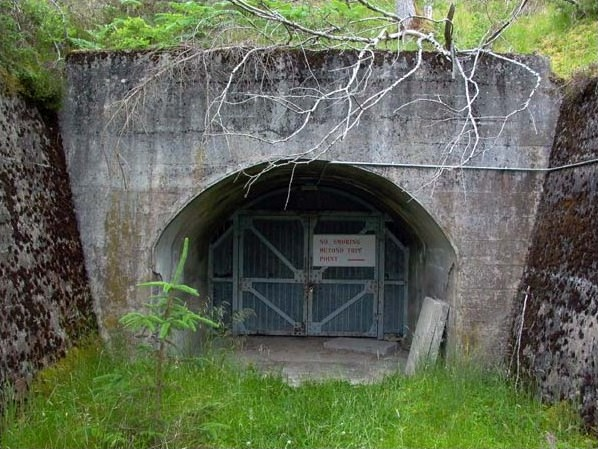
Entrance to the oil depot

The Inchindown oil tanks is a disused underground oil depot in Invergordon, Ross-shire, Scotland. The tanks hold the record for the longest reverberation in any man-made structure, surpassing the Hamilton Mausoleum in 2014.

== History ==
The secret site was officially called "Inchindown, Royal Navy Fuel Tanks" and also known as the "Invergordon Oil Fuel Depot". The complex consists of six tanks: five are 237 m (778 ft) long, 9 m (30 ft) wide, with arched roofs 13.5 m (44 ft) high; a smaller sixth tank is of the same height and breadth but shorter. Work on the tanks began in 1938 and was completed in 1941. They were built to be a bomb-proof supply of furnace fuel oil to the Royal Navy's base at Invergordon.

In 2014, the tanks were designated as a Category A listed building.

== Reverberation record ==
In 2009, guided tours of the tanks were offered by Forestry Commission Scotland. After the tours were mentioned on BBC television programme The One Show, professor of acoustic engineering at the University of Salford Trevor Cox was motivated to perform reverberation tests in the underground tanks. In 2014 Allan Kilpatrick from the Royal Commission on the Ancient and Historical Monuments of Scotland fired a pistol blank inside one of the tanks. The sound was recorded by Cox, and is reported to have reverberated for 112 seconds at 125 hertz, 30 seconds at mid frequency, and 75 seconds broadband.

== In popular culture ==
- In February 2019, photographers Simon Riddell and David Allen recorded a feature-length documentary called 'One Shot: Inchindown'. This documentary contains the only comprehensive tour of the facility. As part of the documentary, the photographers used a large format camera to make one negative of the first tank. They then slept overnight in tunnel 2, which they turned into a darkroom the next day. They continued to create a darkroom print of their negative on location without leaving the underground facility. The film won 'best documentary with the UK Monthly Film Festival.
- The Inchindown oil depot was featured in the "Swamp of Despair" episode of the Science Channel's TV series Mysteries of the Abandoned (season 6, episode 2), first cablecast on 2 April 2020.
- Susan Calman in the third series of the travel program, Secret Scotland went inside a fuel storage tank.
- Watch the Sound With Mark Ronson's episode on reverb goes to the Inchindown Oil Tanks.
- Tom Scott and Matt Gray both made videos of the oil tank, amassing 4.4 million views combined.
- witchtrialversion1 an audiovisual performance work by multidisciplinary artist Sweætshops® was recorded and filmed entirely in the oil tanks. The work is about Janet Horne, the last person executed for witchcraft in the British Isles, who was burned alive in a barrell in the nearby town of Dornoch. It was released as part of Spirit:360 arts programme.
- "Smooring the Fire," an electroacoustic composition, made from sounds recorded at the Inchindown Oil Depot in June 2023. The recordings and resultant composition were by Scottish artists Clare Archibald (as Applicable Tenses) and Anthony Cowie (as Thee Manual Labour), and American artist Mike Bullock (as Ears In Space). Released in March 2024 as a CD and download by American record label Rural Situationism.
- "You And Your Absence", an album consisting of eight tracks written for and recorded in the tanks by musician Thom Isaacs, first released in full on May 18th 2025, with singles "Requiem", "Duration Erosion", and "The Hum" having been released on their own in the time leading up to the release of the album.

== See also ==
- List of Category A listed buildings in Highland
