= It's Your Round =

- Genre: Comedy
- Created by: Benjamin Partridge
- Written by: Angus Deayton; Paul Powell; Benjamin Partridge
- Presented by: Angus Deayton
- Country of origin: United Kingdom
- Original language: English
- No. of series: 2
- No. of episodes: 12

Production
- Producer: Sam Michell
- Running time: 30 minutes

Original release
- Network: BBC Radio 4
- Release: 17 February 2011 – 29 January 2012

It's Your Round is a comedy panel show hosted by Angus Deayton. It airs on BBC Radio 4.

== Format ==
The rules of each round are new every time, as the framework of the rounds is decided by the panellists. Due to the fact that the structure is continuously changing, essentially the format of the show is that it has no format.

Instead, each of the panellists creates and brings their own round to the show for the other panellists to play. Four comedians compete to see who gets to be champion.

For example, in one of the episodes Miles Jupp asked the other panellists to predict whether his dad would know the answers to trivia questions.

== Critical response ==
The Guardian praised Deayton's presentational style, heavy in sardonic wit and mockery, while conceding that some parts of the show were better than others. The Independent was less keen on Deayton but still found the show to be good fun.

== Episodes ==
=== Series 1 ===
Episode	Air date	Guests	Games
1	17 February 2011	Rufus Hound, Miles Jupp, Sara Pascoe, Adam Hills	Them Next Door; What Does My Dad Know? - panellists must guess what answers Miles Jupp's dad will give to various trivia questions; Come To Romford! - everyone makes a tourism pitch for their hometown or homecity, to make it sound an appealing place to go for the other panellists; Newspaper Headline Or Cryptic Crossword Clue - panellists must guess whether a read-out phrase is a newspaper headline or a cryptic crossword clue
2	24 February 2011	Andy Parsons, Rebecca Front, Miles Jupp, Rick Wakeman	What's The Concept? - panellists must guess the concept behind Rick Wakeman's concept album after hearing various track titles read out; It's Not Your Round - in a very selfless game, panellists must vote for someone other than themselves to win this round, and make a case for that person to win
3	3 March 2011	Arthur Smith, Lucy Montgomery, Tom Wrigglesworth, Will Smith	How much would you want to - guests guess how much each of them would charge to do a random task; Twitter-witter-witter-who - a selection of tweets are read out from a celebrity's Twitter page and panellists must try to work out who the celebrity is; Re-wound, Sped Up, Played Backwards
4	10 March 2011	Josie Long, Russell Kane, Alun Cochrane, Milton Jones	Trivia Twin - a series of trivia questions are asked, and the panellists attempt to choose a member of the audience who they think looks like they will be able to answer that question (based on a game called "Nine Previous Convictions"); Mood News - reading out news reports in a certain emotional style (e.g. the weather, read depressingly) and panellists must guess the emotion; (unnamed) - contestants choose what superhero they would be, what superpowers they would have & how they would use them for good (or evil); Lost Punch Lines - guess the punchlines to Christmas cracker jokes
5	17 March 2011	Micky Flanagan, Bridget Christie, Tim Key, Nick Hancock	Cockney Charades - guess the book/film/play/historical event from a description given in rhyming slang e.g. "this bloke who worked in a lamb shank needed help with his tin lids, so out of the lemon meringue comes this nook who really likes to Trudie Styler"; What's Your Problem? - genuine problem letters from agony aunt columns are read out and panellists attempt to guess what advice was given to them; No More Women - panellists go round naming celebrities, choosing a category to eliminate as they go (e.g. "Whitney Houston - no more singers", so no one can now name a singer). Categories can range from 'wrecking ball' size ("no more women") to very specific ("Neneh Cherry - no more people who have a fruit in their name"); Fantasy Funeral - panellists pitch their own perfect, dream funeral
6	24 March 2011	Johnny Vaughan, Alan Davies, Roisin Conaty, Arthur Smith	High-Speed Celebrity Blind Dating - guess the identity of an unknown celebrity based on just one question.; Four Second Warning - think of a name or a title for a new thing within four seconds. Most inspired or imaginative answers wins.; New Olympic Sports - invent a new sport that Great Britain would excel in for the 2012 London Olympic Games. Winner decided by a random audience member.; How Long Would It Take You To... - while stuck in the dullest village in Britain, the contestant must complete a specified challenge (e.g. 'be elected mayor') in order to escape. Each person must write down how long they think it would take them to accomplish, and the other contestants must guess closest to their expectation.

=== Series 2 ===
Episode	Air date	Guests	Games
1	25 December 2011	Fred MacAulay, Josie Long, Miles Jupp, Nick Helm	Test Match Specialists - a quiz using the rules and regulations of the "world's finest sport" - cricket; Play Your Various Different Categories Right - similar to "Play Your Cards Right", but with other variables such as Scottish landmarks, household accident statistics, Radio 4 presenters' heights and the song "Do They Know It's Christmas?" by Band Aid; Dream Day Job - panellists have to guess an audience member's dream day job by asking yes/no questions; Cream Crackered - panellists have to eat as many cream crackers as they can in a minute, commentated on by Test Match Special's Henry Blofeld
2	1 January 2012	Sandi Toksvig, Clive Anderson, Humphrey Ker, Milton Jones	I Fought The Law - a selection of questions based around the idiosyncrasies of British Law; Lost for Words in which panellists must guess the meaning of various foreign words that have no direct translation in English; Pet, Lunch or Hat is a variation on "Snog, Marry, Avoid" (with animals i.e. which animal would you have as a pet, eat for lunch or wear as a hat); Joke Jeopardy in which panellists are given punchlines to cracker jokes and they must guess the set-ups
3	8 January 2012	Will Self, Arthur Smith, Sara Pascoe, Gyles Brandreth	What's In My Hand? (self-explanatory); It's My Party in which panellists must all pitch their own, new political party; Tax Loss Entertainment in which panellists must improvise the worst play in history; How Much Would It Cost For You To? - panellists must guess the amount of money they'd require in order to complete various unpleasant tasks
4	15 January 2012	Andrew Maxwell, Celia Pacquola, Will Smith, Jason Solomons	Jersey Quiz - quiz questions about the Channel Island town of Jersey; Now That's Charity! - panellists must each pitch a charity, which they would use to acquire enough money to eradicate their personal debts - such as men in flip-flops, Jennifer Aniston films, or people who constantly check their phones; Tagline Tease in which panellists have to guess the tagline to a particular film; Boarder, Boarder, Boarder or Boarder in which panellists are given a slang term and they have to guess whether it's from the world of snowboarding, surfboarding, clapper-boarding or boarding school
5	22 January 2012	Lucy Porter, Tom Wrigglesworth, Lloyd Langford, Robert Popper	Who's the Daddy? in which the other three, childless, male panellists complete quotes from a 70's parenting bible; Dodo's Den in which each contestant must pitch their idea for a new invention that they think will make them their millions; ORAG (aka The Opposite Rhyming Animal Game) in which the panellists have to guess the animal that rhymes with the opposite of the word given; The Price Is Right based on Welsh talisman and eccentric, Dr William Price
6	29 January 2012	Rufus Hound, Roisin Conaty, Alex Horne, Paul Sinha	Font, Fighter or Fragrance in which panellists are given a word and they must guess whether it refers to a typographical font, the name of a gladiator from ITV's show "Gladiators" or a "Lynx deodorant" fragrance; Four Second Pitch in which panellists have four seconds to pitch the elements of an idea for a blockbuster film and a new religion; World Record Recall in which panellists have to fill in the missing details from the description of a real record from the Guinness Book of World Records; Which Lady Done Say That Thing in which panellists must guess which audience member said a certain phrase ("as the title suggests")

.
