= Tom Wrigglesworth =

English comedian

Thomas James Wrigglesworth
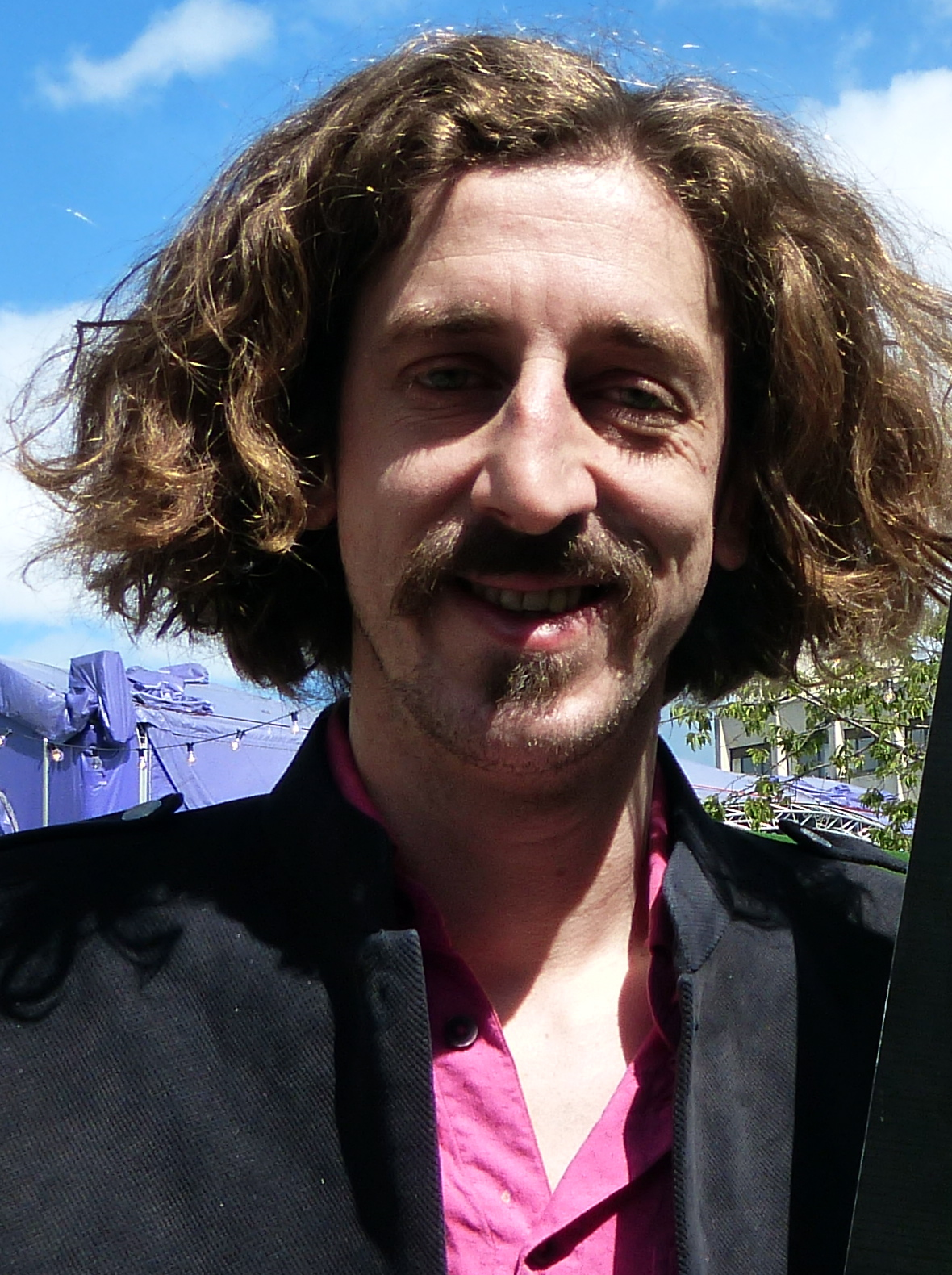
- Wrigglesworth in 2013
- Born: 5 May 1976 (age 50); Sheffield, South Yorkshire, England
- Notable work: Open Letters, Engineering Giants, Outrageous Acts of Science

Comedy career
- Medium: Stand-up comedy, Radio and television
- Website: tomwrigglesworth.co.uk

Thomas James Wrigglesworth is an English comedian. He was born and raised in Sheffield, South Yorkshire. In 2009 he was nominated for the main Edinburgh Comedy Award (formerly the Perrier awards) at the Edinburgh Festival Fringe.

== Early life ==
Wrigglesworth was born in Sheffield, South Yorkshire, the fourth of five siblings; he comes from Totley in south-west Sheffield. He was educated at King Ecgbert School, and went on to study Electrical Engineering and then Acoustics at Salford University (Salford Acoustics).

== Career ==
After graduating, he worked in the telecommunications and satellite industry, before caving in to friends' repeated requests to perform stand-up comedy.

=== Stand-up comedy ===
Wrigglesworth began performing stand up comedy in 2003, when he won the So You Think You're Funny award. In 2006, he quit his day job and became a full-time comedian on the UK comedy circuit.

His debut Edinburgh show in 2008 was titled I'm Struggling To See How That's Helping. But it was in 2009 that his second hour-long show, An Open Return letter to Richard Branson, bought him critical acclaim. The show was based on a true story, beginning with Wrigglesworth narrating a letter to Sir Richard Branson. It goes on to describe a hung-over Wrigglesworth boarding a Virgin train at Manchester, and witnessing a ticket inspector forcing an OAP called Lena Ainscow to purchase a new full-price train ticket. Wrigglesworth then conducted a whipround to help Lena, much to the annoyance of the ticket inspector, who arranged for the police to meet the train at Euston, after stating Wrigglesworth would be charged with begging. Thanks to several other passengers becoming embroiled in the story, a furore ensued and he and Lena were released from police questioning. The show ends with the conclusion of the letter to Richard Branson, the point of which was to ask Branson for help in making train fares fairer.

After the Edinburgh run, the show toured around the UK, New Zealand, and the Montreal Comedy Festival, before a half-hour version was aired on BBC Radio 4 in 2010.

His third Edinburgh show in 2010—called Tom Wrigglesworth's Nightmare Dream Wedding—then toured the UK, before Wrigglesworth took a two-year hiatus from performing at the festival. In 2013, he returned with a new show called Utterly at Odds with the Universe, which is expected to tour the UK and further afield in 2014. This show tracks the relationship he had with his grandfather, centring on audio cassette interviews made in the mid 80s, when Wrigglesworth was a small child.

In 2014, Wrigglesworth performed in Green Bay, Wisconsin after his strong resemblance to Green Bay Packers quarterback Aaron Rodgers caught attention in the media. He eventually got to meet Rodgers at Lambeau Field, in addition to receiving the key to the city, as well as a custom Packers jersey, sporting his name and Rodgers's number 12.

=== Radio ===
Wrigglesworth regularly appears as a panellist on shows such as The Unbelievable Truth, It's Not What You Know and It's Your Round, as well as providing the continuity links for one week every month on The Comedy Club on BBC Radio 4 Extra.

In early 2011, he recorded a series of four live performances called Tom Wrigglesworth's Open Letters for BBC Radio 4. Each episode was based on different examples of maddening corporate policies in areas such as utility companies and wheel clampers. Each episode highlighted the sometimes infuriating rationales behind huge organisations, and featured a letter from his grandmother to try to get to the bottom of the comedic issues raised in the programme. A second series of the same format was broadcast in May 2012.

In 2013, he started recording his latest series for Radio 4, called Tom Wrigglesworth's Hang Ups. The series is based on telephone calls he makes to his family in Sheffield, interspersed with sections of stand up as the stories unfold. The series was written by Wrigglesworth and James Kettle with additional material from Miles Jupp. It was recorded live at the BBC Radio Theatre with Judy Parfitt, Kate Anthony and Paul Copley playing the parts of his Granny, Mum, and Dad respectively. Elizabeth Bennett took over from Parfitt in subsequent series of the show. Series 5 was first broadcast in 2019.

He also appears regularly alongside Rhod Gilbert on the Rhod Gilbert Radio show, Saturday mornings on BBC Radio Wales.

=== Television ===
Wrigglesworth has twice appeared on Live at the Comedy Store for the Paramount Comedy Channel, as well as Edinburgh Comedy Live.

In 2009, he starred in three part BBC 2 TV series Electric Dreams, which took an "average" British family back to the 1970s, 80s, and then 90s, and charted their experience and reactions to gadgets that were available at the time.

In 2012, he co-hosted another three part series for BBC 2, Engineering Giants, which oversaw the dismantling and maintenance of massive machines, namely an oil platform, a passenger ferry, and a Boeing 747 Jumbo Jet.

He has also been a contributor for the programme You Have Been Warned for all five seasons so far, and on Dead or Alive for Discovery TV channel.

He has appeared in 2 seasons (2012–2014) in 24 episodes as himself – Engineer on the TV Show Outrageous Acts of Science for Discovery TV channel.

In the US he has appeared in a State Farm commercial due to his strong resemblance to American football player Aaron Rodgers.

== Personal life ==
Wrigglesworth lives in East London. He has twin daughters. He is a fan of Sheffield Wednesday Football Club.

=== Awards and nominations ===
- 2003 – So You Think You're Funny – Winner
- 2004 – Chortle Awards Best Newcomer – Nominee
- 2009 – Edinburgh Comedy Award – Nominee
- 2009 – Time Out Breakthrough Act – Winner
- 2010 – Chortle Best Show – Winner
- 2010 – Sony Radio Award – Winner
- 2010 – New Zealand Comedy Festival International Act – Winner
