= Megan Ballard =

American acoustical engineer

Megan S. Ballard is an American acoustical engineer and oceanographer whose research models sound waves in shallow ocean waters and their associated sediments (such as mud, silt, and clay), inverts those models to determine the properties of marine sediments, and tunes her models by comparison with direct measurements. She is a senior research scientist in the Applied Research Laboratories of the University of Texas at Austin, and an adjunct faculty member in the university's Walker Department of Mechanical Engineering.

== Education and career ==
Ballard is originally from Grand Rapids, Michigan. She studied ocean engineering at Florida Atlantic University, where she graduated in 2005, after internships at the Harbor Branch Oceanographic Institute, Naval Sea Systems Command, and Lockheed Martin Corporation. She completed a Ph.D. in acoustics at Pennsylvania State University in 2009, under the supervision of Kyle Becker.

She joined the Applied Research Laboratories as a postdoctoral researcher from 2010 to 2011, supported by the Office of Naval Research under a Postdoctoral Special Research Award, and continued as a permanent staff member beginning in 2012.

In 2015 she was elected to chair the Underwater Acoustics Technical Committee of the Acoustical Society of America, for a term from 2015 to 2018.

== Recognition ==
Ballard received the 2016 R. Bruce Lindsay Award of the Acoustical Society of America. In 2021 the Institute of Acoustics, a British acoustics society, named her as the recipient of their A. B. Wood Medal and Prize. She is the 2025 recipient of the Medwin Prize in Acoustical Oceanography of the Acoustical Society of America.

In 2018 she was elected as a Fellow of the Acoustical Society of America, "for contributions to shallow water propagation and geoacoustic inversion".
