= Gia Milinovich =

American-British television presenter and writer

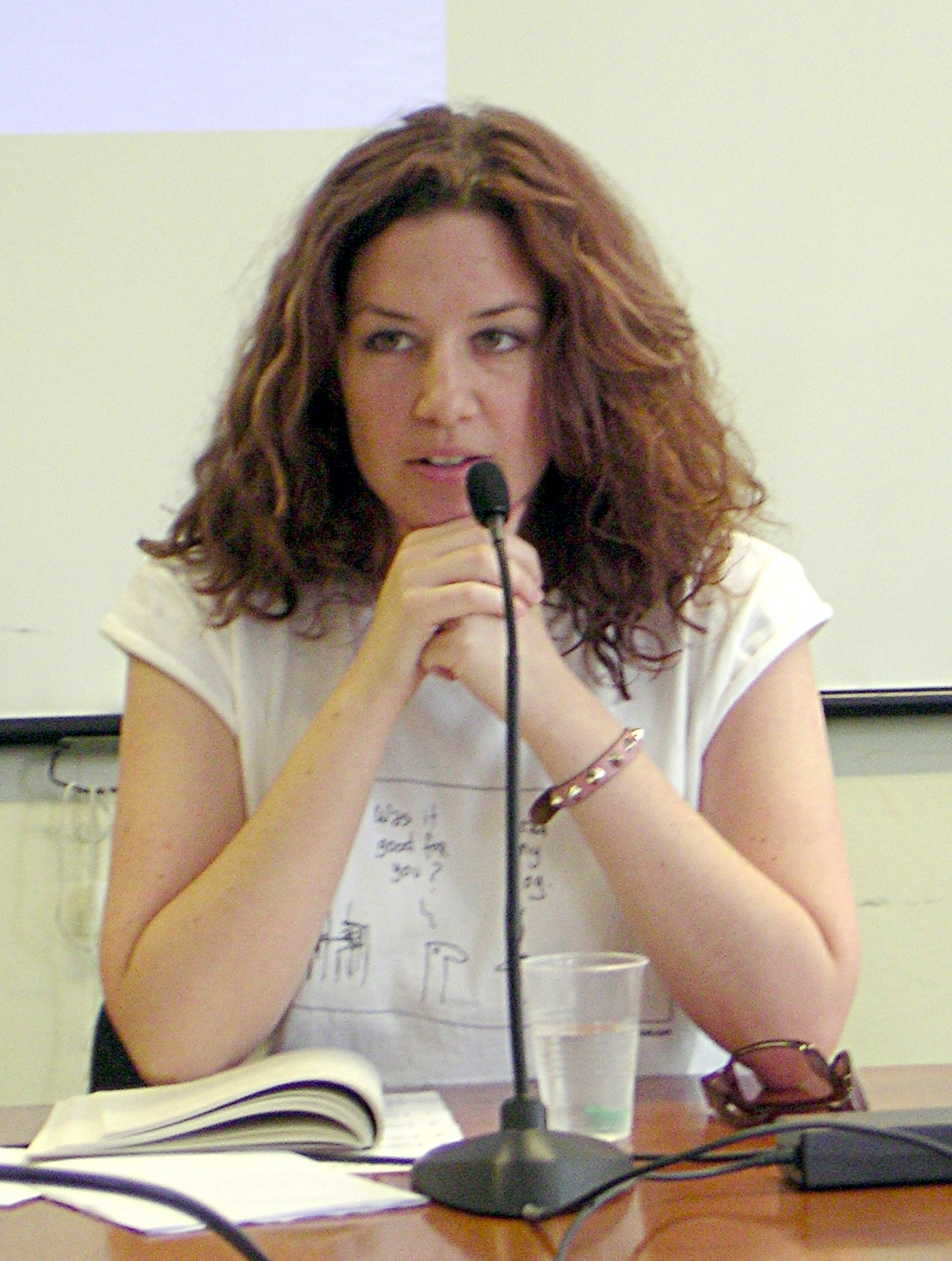
- Milinovich on a panel at Open Tech in London, England in July 2005
- Born: Gia Michele Milinovich; 11 July 1969 (age 57); Hibbing, Minnesota, US
- Occupations: News media expert, blogger, television presenter, writer
- Spouse: Brian Cox (m. 2003)
- Children: 2
- Website: giagia.co.uk

Gia Michele Milinovich (born 11 July 1969) is an American-British television presenter and writer.

== Early life ==
Milinovich was born in Minnesota to a Croatian family.

== Career ==
Milinovich presented television programmes such as Channel 4's Demolition Day (2003–2006), as well as Sky Sports, Nickelodeon and BBC Radio 5 Live shows. She produced the "behind the scenes" website for the film Sunshine and was part of the technical support team for the BBC programme Electric Dreams in 2009.

== Politics ==
Milinovich was a convenor of the cross-party political movement, More United.

Since 2014 Milinovich has been involved in 'gender critical' politics. In January 2022, Milinovich was a member of the Advisory Group of Sex Matters, the British gender advocacy group. As of December 2024, she is no longer a member of the Advisory Group.

== Personal life ==
Milinovich married British particle physicist and television presenter Brian Cox in Duluth, Minnesota in 2003. As of 2025, she resides in London with Cox and their teenage son.

== Filmography ==
=== Television ===
- TVFM – The Children's Channel (1992)
- The Electric String Vest – The Children's Channel (1993–94)
- Hot or Not – Nickelodeon (1995)
- Ice warriors – Sky Sport (1995–96)
- The Big Byte – BBC Radio 5 (1995–96)
- Sky Sport Live – BSkyB (1995–2000)
- Cliff Richard's Pro Celebrity Tennis – BSkyB (1998)
- The Kit – BBC Knowledge (1999–2000)
- The Circuit, The Pulse, 10 x 10, The Object – Network of the World (2000–2002)
- And God Created Gadgets – Channel 4 (2002)
- Click Online – BBC World (2002–2003)
- Demolition Day – C4 & Discovery (2003–2006)
- LBC Radio – Gadget Expert (2006–2007)
- The Cinema Show – BBC Four (2006–2007)
- The Most Annoying TV We Hate to Love – BBC Three (2007)
- Charlie Brooker’s Screenwipe – BBC Four (2008)
- The One Show – BBC One (2009)
- Richard & Judy – UKTV Watch (2009)
- Electric Dreams – BBC Four (2009)

=== Film ===
- The X Files: I Want To Believe (UK release)
- Sunshine
- 28 Weeks Later
