= Olga Umnova =

British academic

Olga Umnova (Russian: Ольга Вячеславовна Умнова) is a Russian-born British academic, lecturer in theoretical acoustics in the acoustics department at the University of Salford. In recognition of her contribution to the field of acoustics, she was awarded the prestigious Tyndall Medal by the Institute of Acoustics in 2010.

Umnova holds a degree in applied physics and mathematics from the Moscow Institute of Physics and Technology and a PhD in acoustics from General Physics Institute, Russian Academy of Science (1994). She has been a research fellow at the Open University, University of Hull and since 2004 she is an academic at the University of Salford.

She has been involved actively in the professional life of the acoustic community in the UK and overseas, serving as a member of the Institute of Acoustics (IOA), member of the Engineering and Physical Sciences Research Council (EPSRC) Peer Review College, associate editor of the Journal of Applied Acoustics and the Journal of ACTA Acoustica (united with Acustica).
