= Sloan Water Technology =

UK company

Sloan Water Technology Ltd. is a UK company founded on the inventions of Timothy Leighton, the company's Executive General Director and Inventor-in-Chief.

== Streams of work ==
In the late 1980s, Leighton discovered a new ultrasonic signal that he identified as due to surface waves on the walls of gas bubbles in liquids. Multidisciplinary research in the following 12 parallel streams of work turned this discovery into Sloan Water Technology Ltd. Because Leighton's research was fundamental, in addition to leading to Sloan Water Technology Ltd., he generated impact by following this fundamental work into other applications. The 12 streams of work that he undertook that led to Sloan Water Technology Ltd. were:

1. Theory of how to stimulate these surface waves;
2. measurement of the liquid convection and shear generated by these surface waves and the practical use that can be made of this;
3. theory on how sound causes the bubbles to generate cracks;
4. theory for acoustics in porous materials (leading to the first theory, and later follow-ups, to show why passing ultrasound through different directions in the human ankle could monitor osteoporosis);
5. the world's first measurements of the bubble size distribution for industry and in the ocean surf zone, leading to ocean measurements necessary to predict the climatological significance of the transfer of carbon dioxide between atmosphere and ocean. It also provided techniques for measurement in industrial pipelines which led to sensors for the oil and gas, carbon capture and storage, ceramics and nuclear industries.
6. acoustic losses in water surrounded on all sides by air and containing microscopic natural particles;
7. acoustic propagation down straight columns of liquid with pressure release walls, and the effect of bubbles within such columns;
8. acoustic propagation down curved columns of fluid, and how horns could facilitate this (and what this tells us about voices on other worlds!);
9. use of acoustic pulses to enhance bubble activity, and the mechanisms by which this could impact biomedical processes;
10. controlled bubble generation;
11. how these bubbles affect living cells
12. the practical application of the technology to cleaning surfaces contaminated with dental bacteria, protein marine biofoulant, 'leaves on the line' and other contaminants.

These 12 streams of fundamental research represented the knowledge on which Sloan Water Technology Ltd. was founded.

== History ==
Having purchased Leighton's patent suite from the University of Southampton in 2018, the Allen family chose to name the new R&D facilities 'The Leighton Laboratories', consisting of physical science labs, mechanical engineering and electronic engineering labs, workshops, and microbiology and tissue laboratories, co-locating multiple disciplines as Professor Leighton had advocated to address unsolved problems of a societal scale (food and water security, anti-microbial resistance). The company is currently producing technology for cleaning and changing surfaces using only cold water, air bubbles and sound (without chemicals or drugs). This reduces the use of water and electricity, reduces pollution and has run-off that is easier to convert back to drinking water, and reduces the threat of 'superbugs'.

== Key inventions ==
Sloan Water Technology Ltd. has invented technology for cleaning surgical instruments Food cleaning inventions have been developed for salad (which cannot be sterilized by heat treatment, and each year results in serious illness and even death from E. Coli contamination) and hay (to reduce respiratory illness contracted through animal feed). In the early days of the COVID-19 pandemic, when it was not known if the transmission route was airborne or through touch surfaces, Sloan Water Technology developed devices to clean touch surfaces. Sloan Water Technology's most significant product is aimed at reducing the suffering from chronic wounds, which cause huge suffering and costs the UK NHS over £5-billion per year.
