= 1970s in furniture =

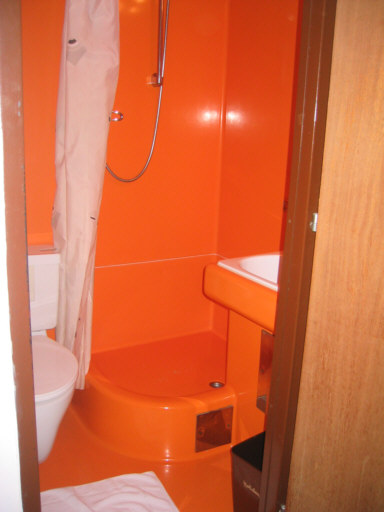
A 1970s hotel bathroom with characteristic color patterns associated with 1970s decor

Furniture of the 1970s refers to the style of furniture popular during the 1970s.

== Historical context ==
The social climate of the 1970s brought about a decline in the modernist trend that had dominated the 1960s. Emerging trends targeted a new generation of consumers — particularly older youth who had already experienced the modernist aesthetics of the 1950s and 1960s and had lived through significant social upheavals, including ongoing civil rights protests and the Vietnam War.

Consumers in the 1970s valued comfort and flexibility more than in the previous decade. As colorful, eye-catching designs entered the mainstream, furniture began to evolve toward something more practical.

== Design elements ==
1970s furniture was frequently decorated with bold fabric patterns and colors. These striking designs and prints were also used extensively in other areas of interior decor. Additional design elements found in 1970s furniture and interiors included the use of particular colors — especially brown, purple, orange, and yellow, sometimes all in the same piece of fabric — as well as shag-pile carpet, textured walls, lacquered furniture, gaudy lampshades, lava lamps, and molded plastic furniture.

=== Trends ===
Several distinct trends characterized 1970s furniture and interior design.

Bold colors and earthy tones. Vibrant colors such as orange, purple, and yellow were widely used. These were often complemented by earthy tones that offered less contrast than the stark modernism of the preceding decades.

Patterns. Patterns featuring bright colors were common across fabrics and upholstery.

Modular furniture. Modular and multifunctional furniture was explored and refined during the decade, reflecting a growing emphasis on flexibility in domestic spaces.

Softer, ergonomic forms. Furniture of the 1970s became increasingly ergonomic, with rounded shapes and softer forms replacing the harder lines of earlier modernist design.

== Materials ==
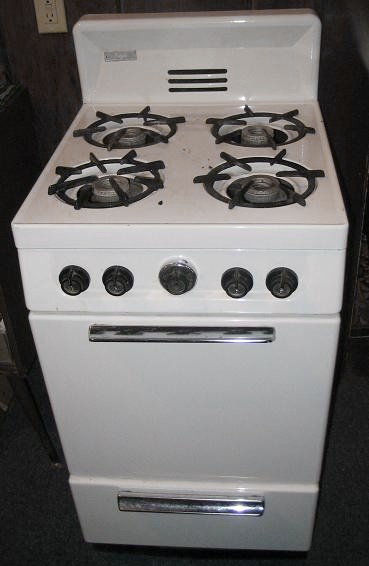
A gas stove from the 1970s

A major aspect of 1970s furniture is the prominent use of teak wood. Teak had regained popularity in fashionable furniture and panelling during the 1960s, and pieces became chunkier as its use continued into the 1970s. The prevalence of wood in the home also encouraged darker color palettes. In the mid-to-late 1970s, pine wood began to replace teak, and color palettes darkened further.

Material experimentation had a significant impact on furniture design, as designers sought to combine familiar materials and styles with new approaches. A growing focus on sustainability and natural materials also emerged. Common materials of the period included plywood, laminates, plastic, foam, rattan, pine, cotton, corduroy, and vinyl.

== Notable 1970s furniture pieces ==
Several furniture pieces gained widespread popularity during the 1970s.

The Lava lamp, invented in 1963, became a widely recognized fixture of 1970s home decor.

The Sacco Chair (better known as a bean bag) was released in 1969 by Cesare Paolini, Franco Teodoro, and Piero Gatti. It later debuted at the 1972 exhibition Italy: The New Domestic Landscape – Achievements and Problems of Italian Design at the Museum of Modern Art (MoMA), gaining traction as a household staple. The Sacco Chair was consistent with the ergonomic trends of the decade.

The Omkstak Chair, designed by Rodney Kinsman in 1972, remains in production today.

The Boby Trolley, designed by Joe Colombo, was released in Italy in 1970 and is now part of MoMA's permanent collection.

The Ciffra 3 was designed by Gino Valle.

The Impala Chair, designed by Gillis Lundgren and released by IKEA in 1971, became one of the decade's recognized seating designs.

The Papasan Chair also gained broad popularity during this period.

== Gallery ==
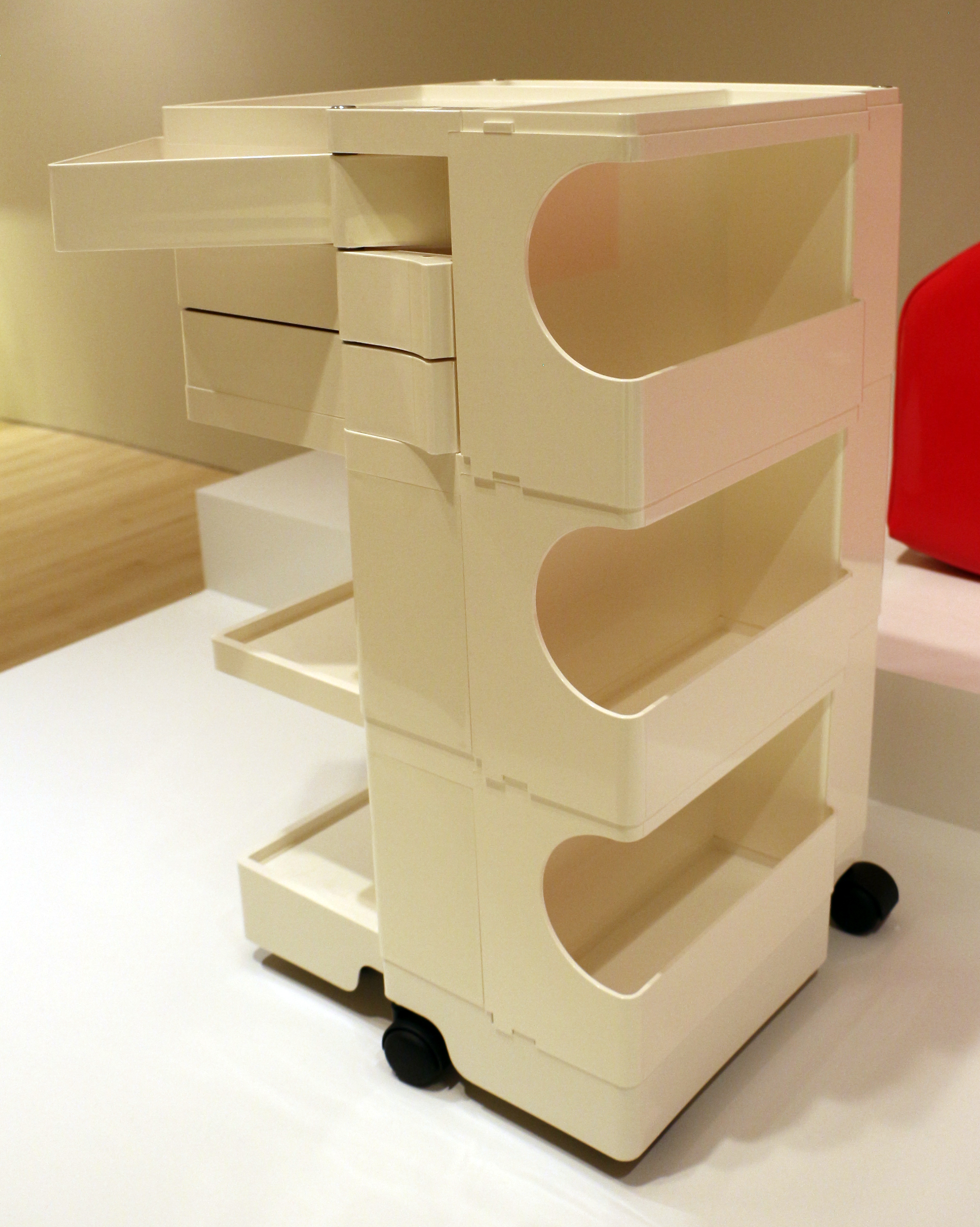
A Boby Trolley (c. 1970) from the Indianapolis Museum of Art

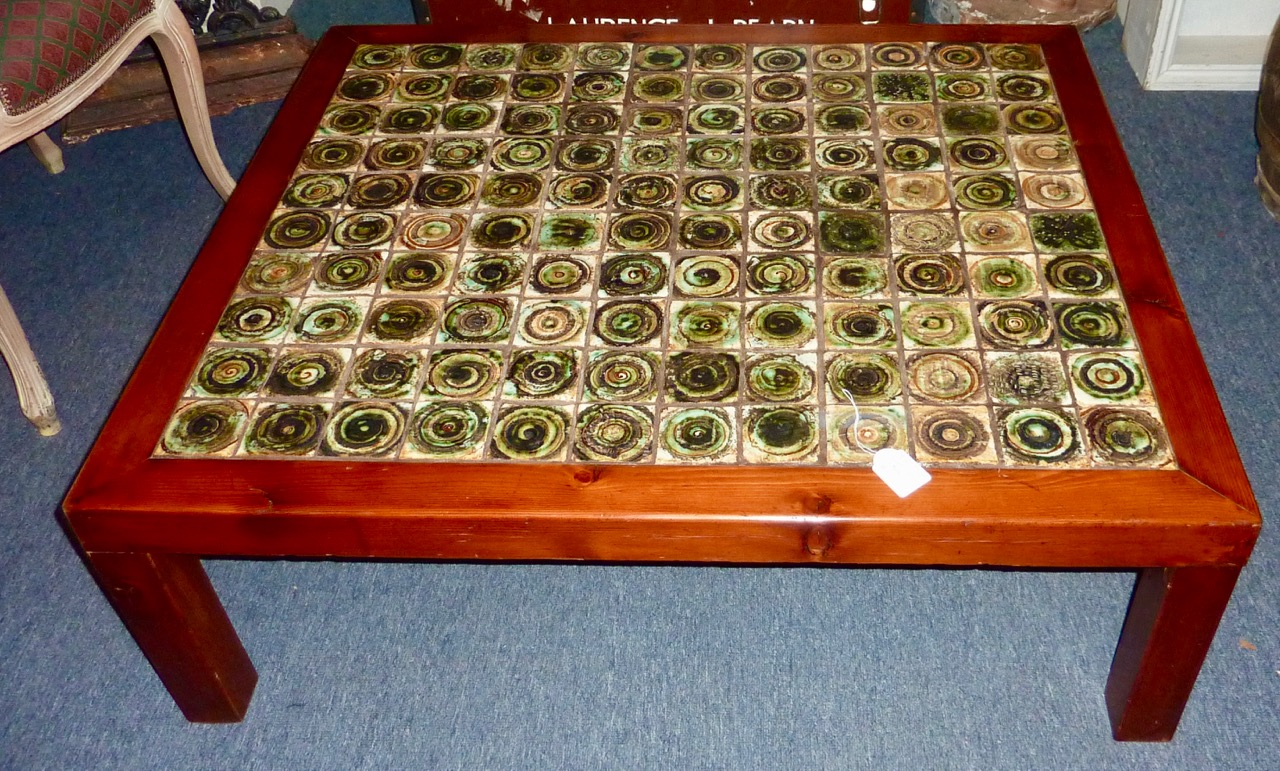
A 1970s tile top coffee table

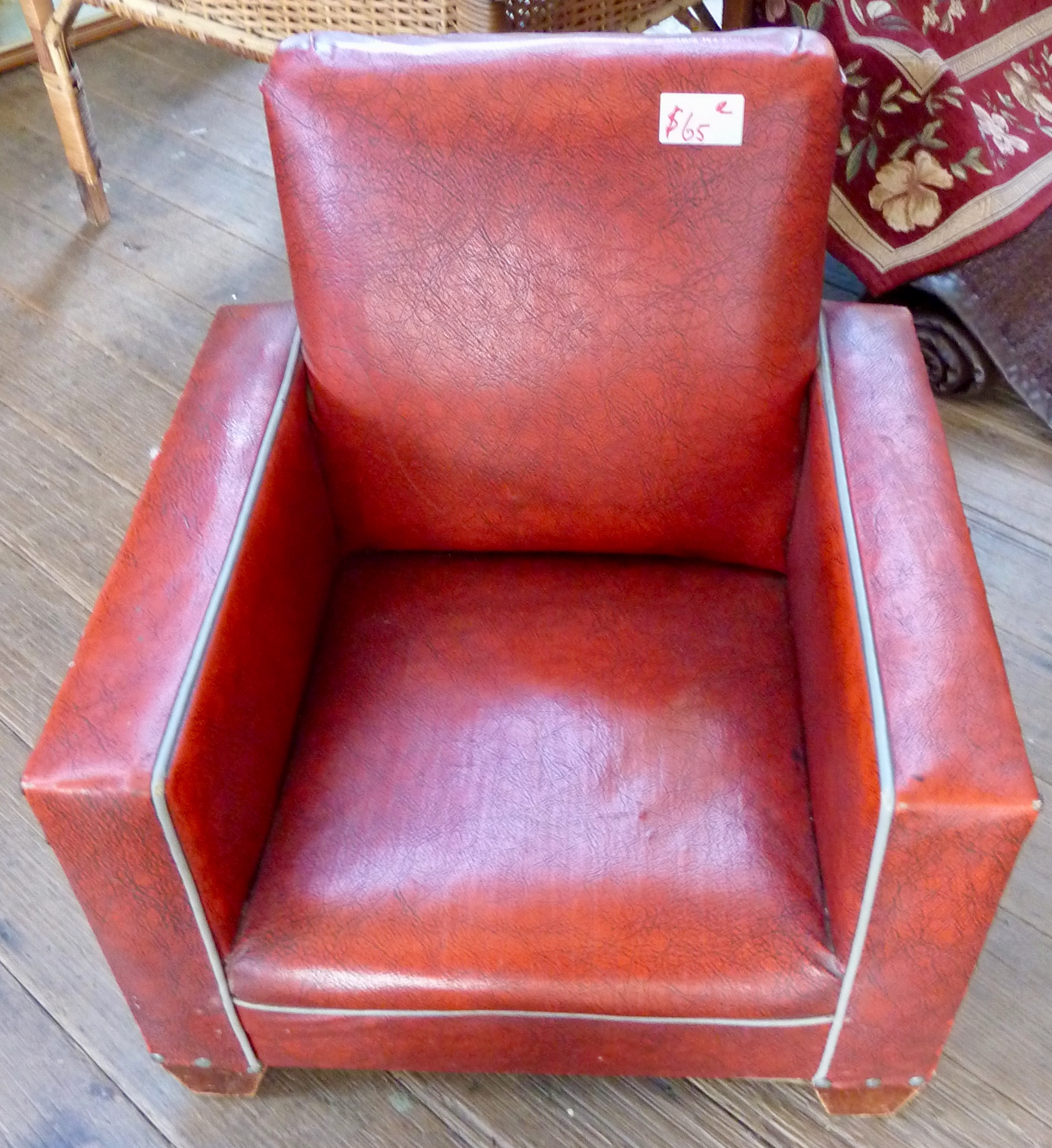
A 1970s vinyl chair

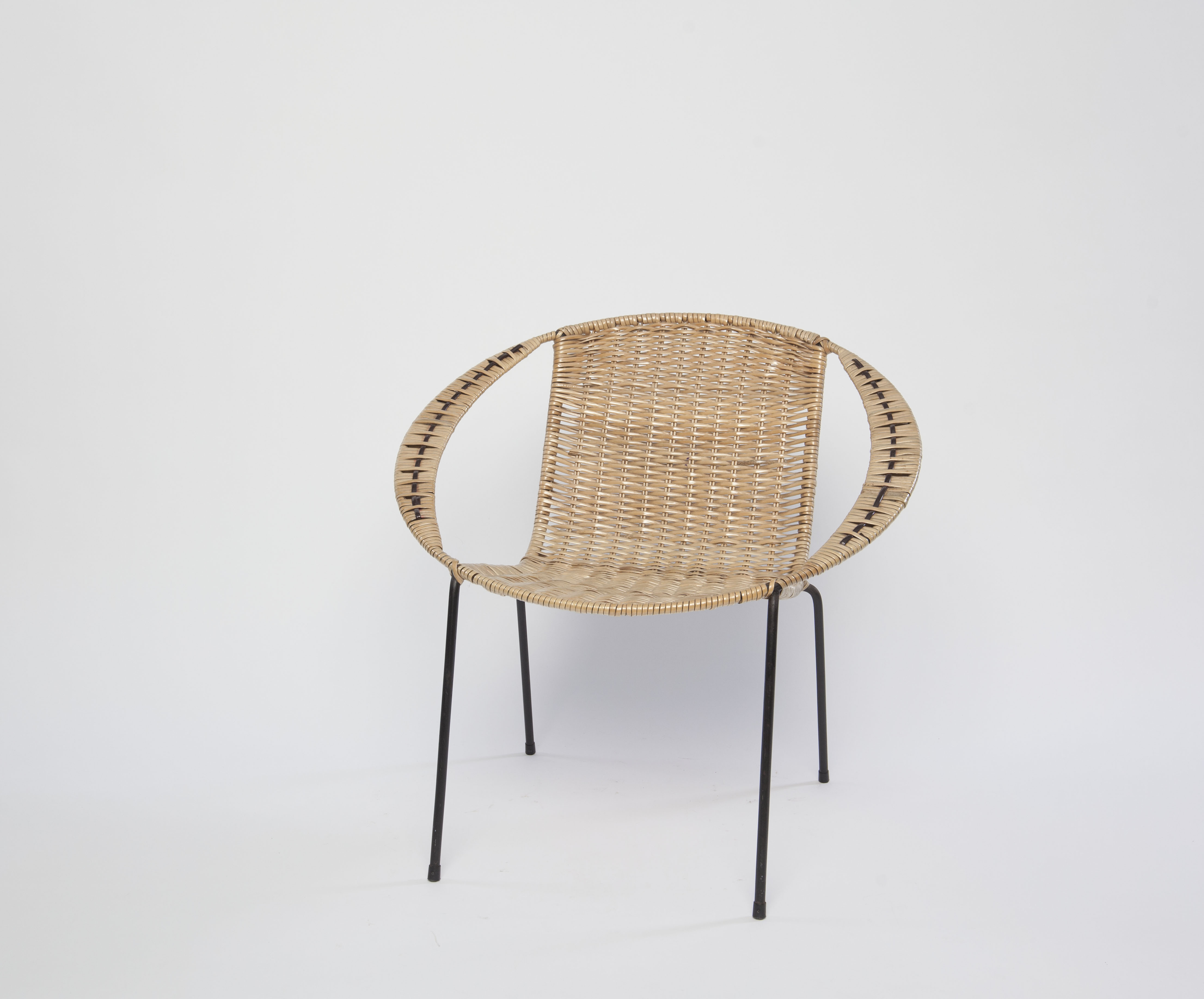
Coolie chair (ca. 1960s–70s)

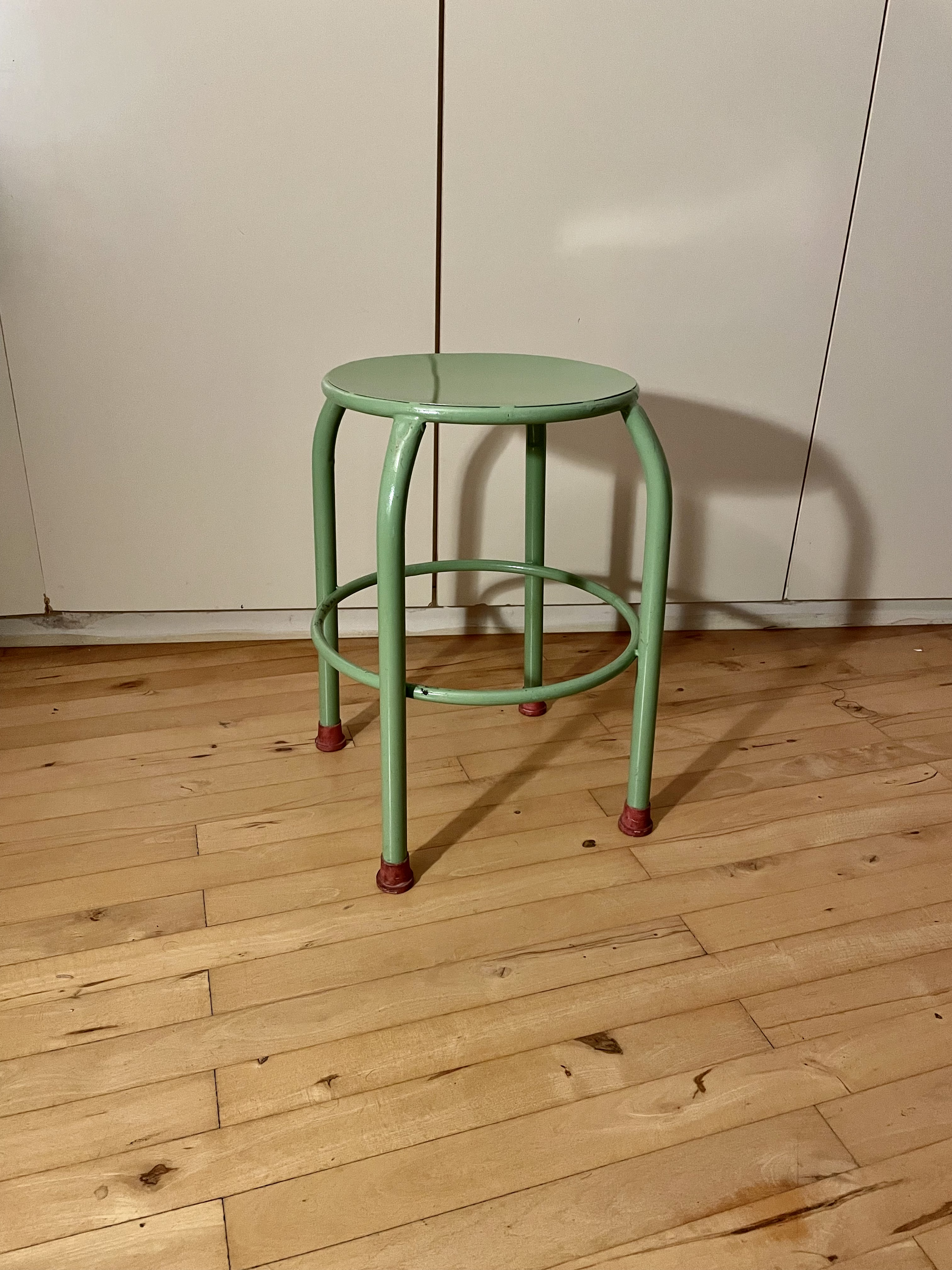
A 1970s industrial steel stool from Belgium

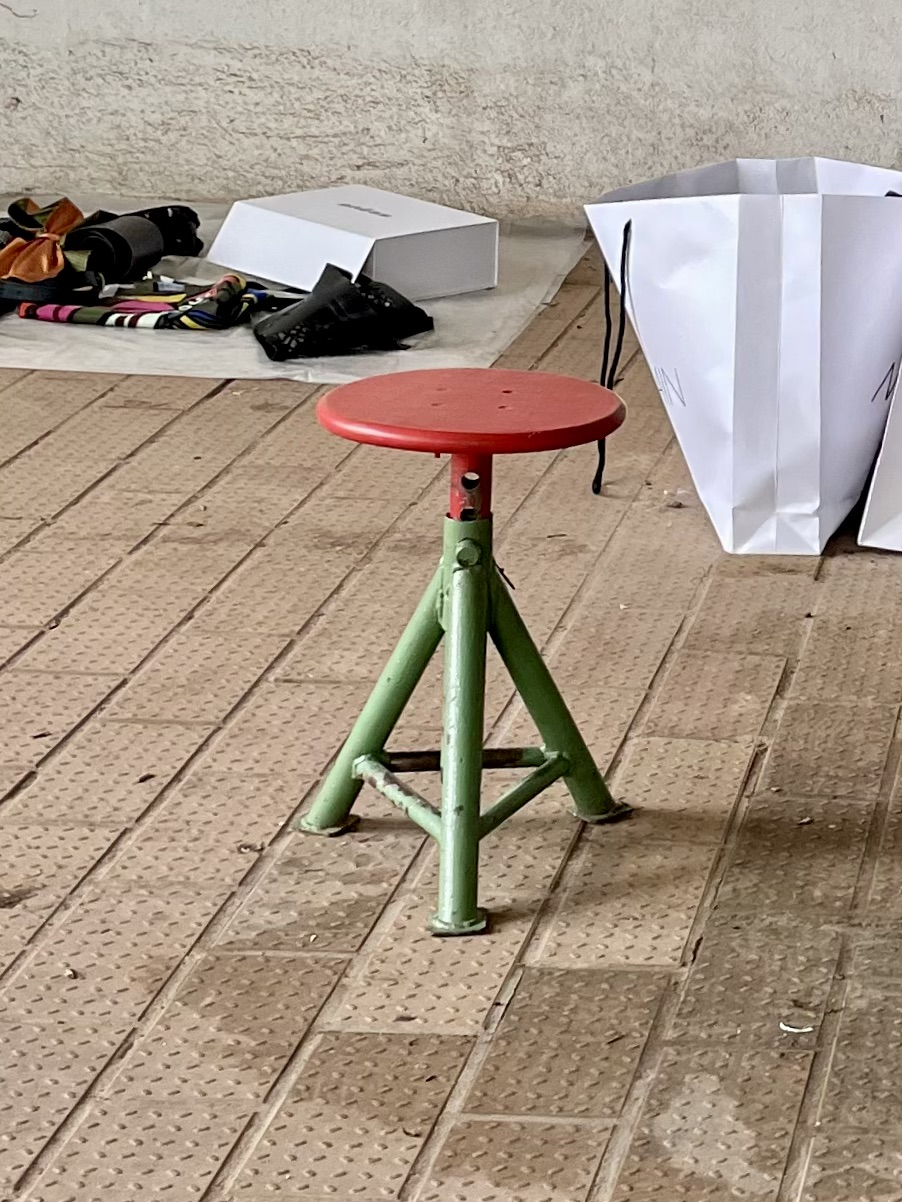
A 1970s industrial steel stool from Antwerp

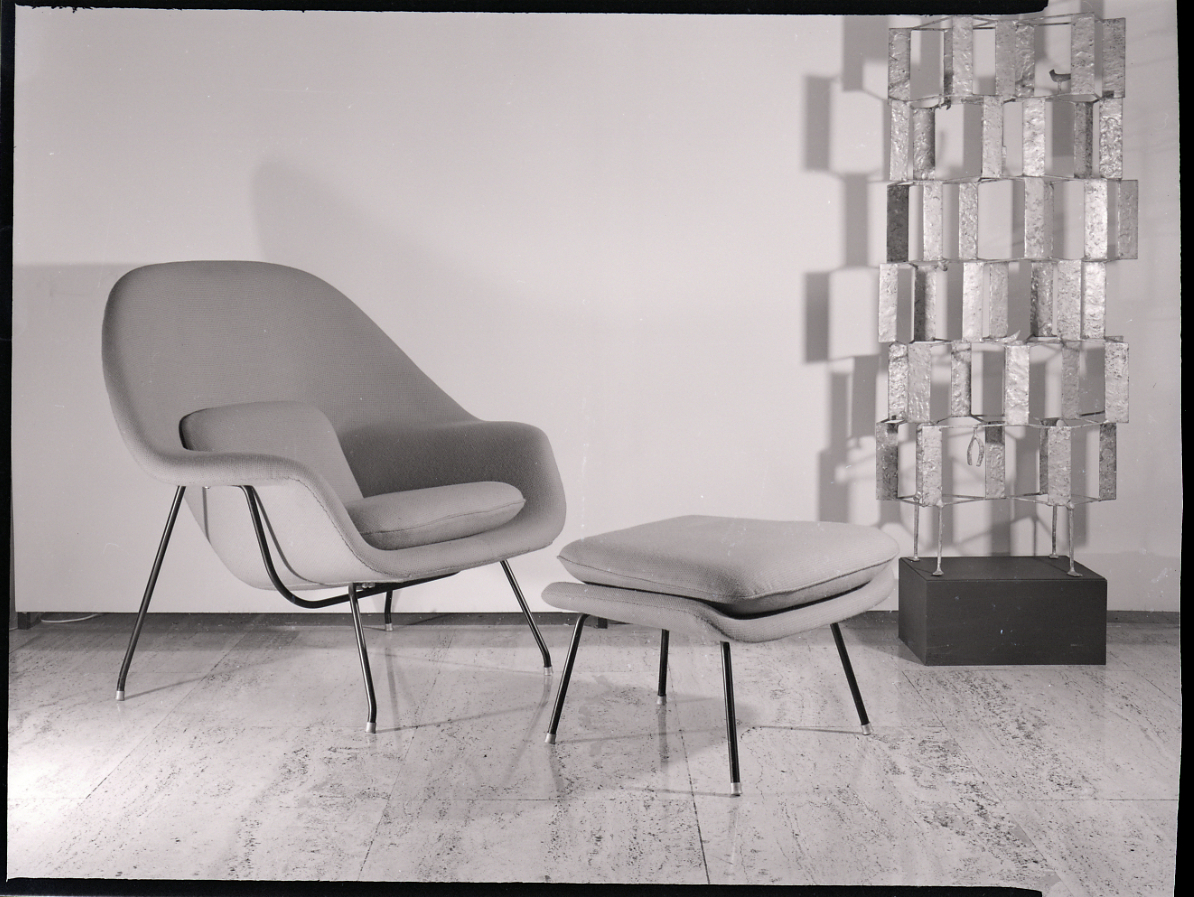
A living room set up from the 1970s

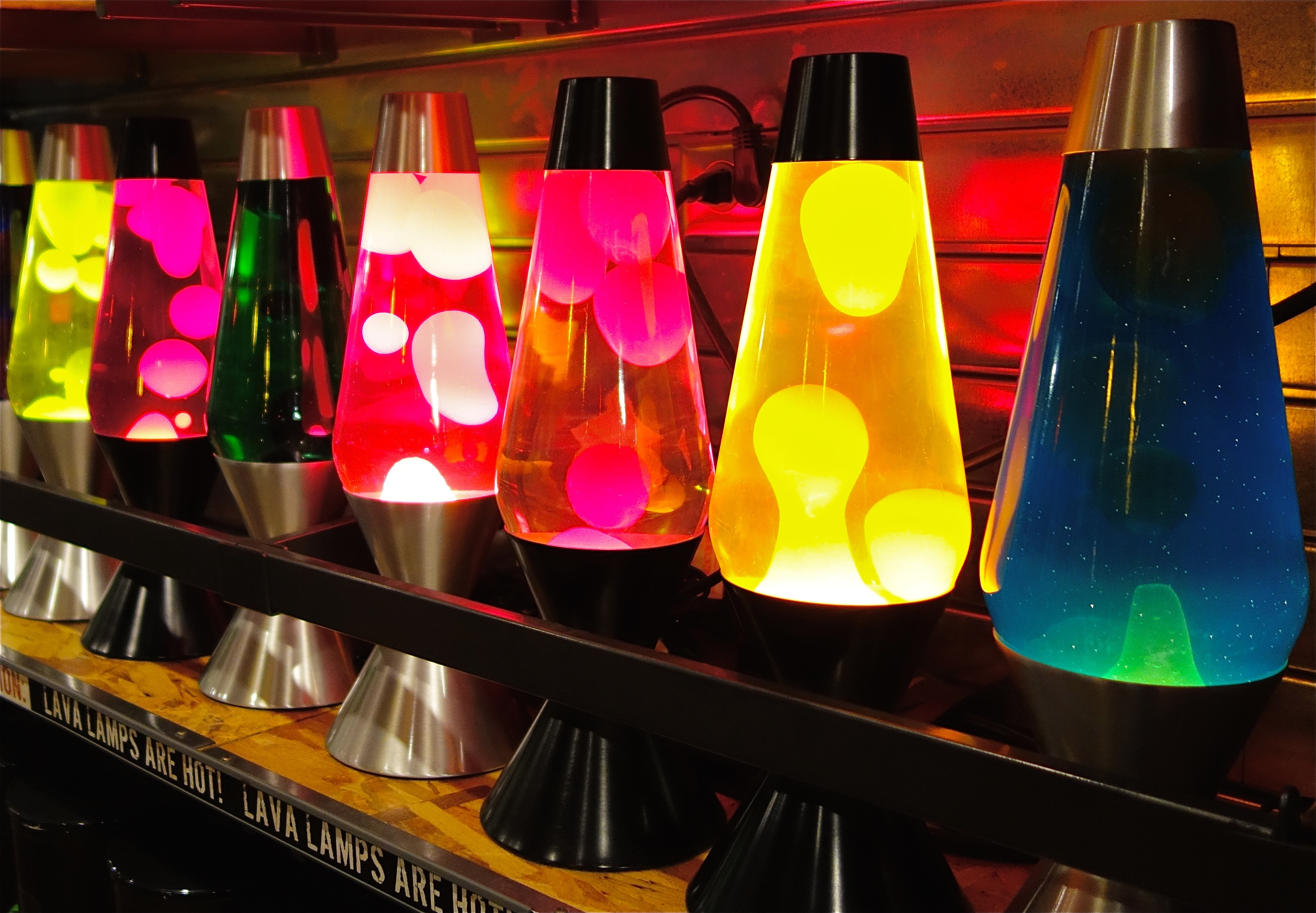
Lava lamps

== See also ==
- 1970s in fashion
