= Valeri Umnov =

Russian footballer and coach

Personal information
- Full name: Valeri Vladimirovich Umnov
- Date of birth: 11 December 1974 (age 51)
- Place of birth: Mineralnye Vody, Stavropol Krai, Russian SFSR
- Height: 1.85 m (6 ft 1 in)
- Positions: Defender; midfielder

Senior career*
Years	Team	Apps	(Gls)
1992	FC Lokomotiv Mineralnye Vody	14	(0)
1995–1998	FC Lokomotiv Mineralnye Vody	137	(38)
1999	FC Volgar-Gazprom Astrakhan	10	(0)
2000	FC Lokomotiv-Taim Mineralnye Vody (D4)		
2001	FC Dynamo Stavropol	8	(0)
2002	FC Nemkom Krasnodar	14	(0)
2003–2012	FC Mashuk-KMV Pyatigorsk	252	(38)

Managerial career
- 2013: FC Mashuk-KMV Pyatigorsk
- * Club domestic league appearances and goals

Valeri Vladimirovich Umnov (Russian: Валерий Владимирович Умнов; born 11 December 1974) is a Russian professional football coach and a former player.

== Club career ==
He played 4 seasons in the Russian Football National League for FC Volgar-Gazprom Astrakhan and FC Mashuk-KMV Pyatigorsk.
