= Timothy Leighton =

Professor of Ultrasonics and Underwater Acoustics

Timothy Leighton FRS FREng FMedSci
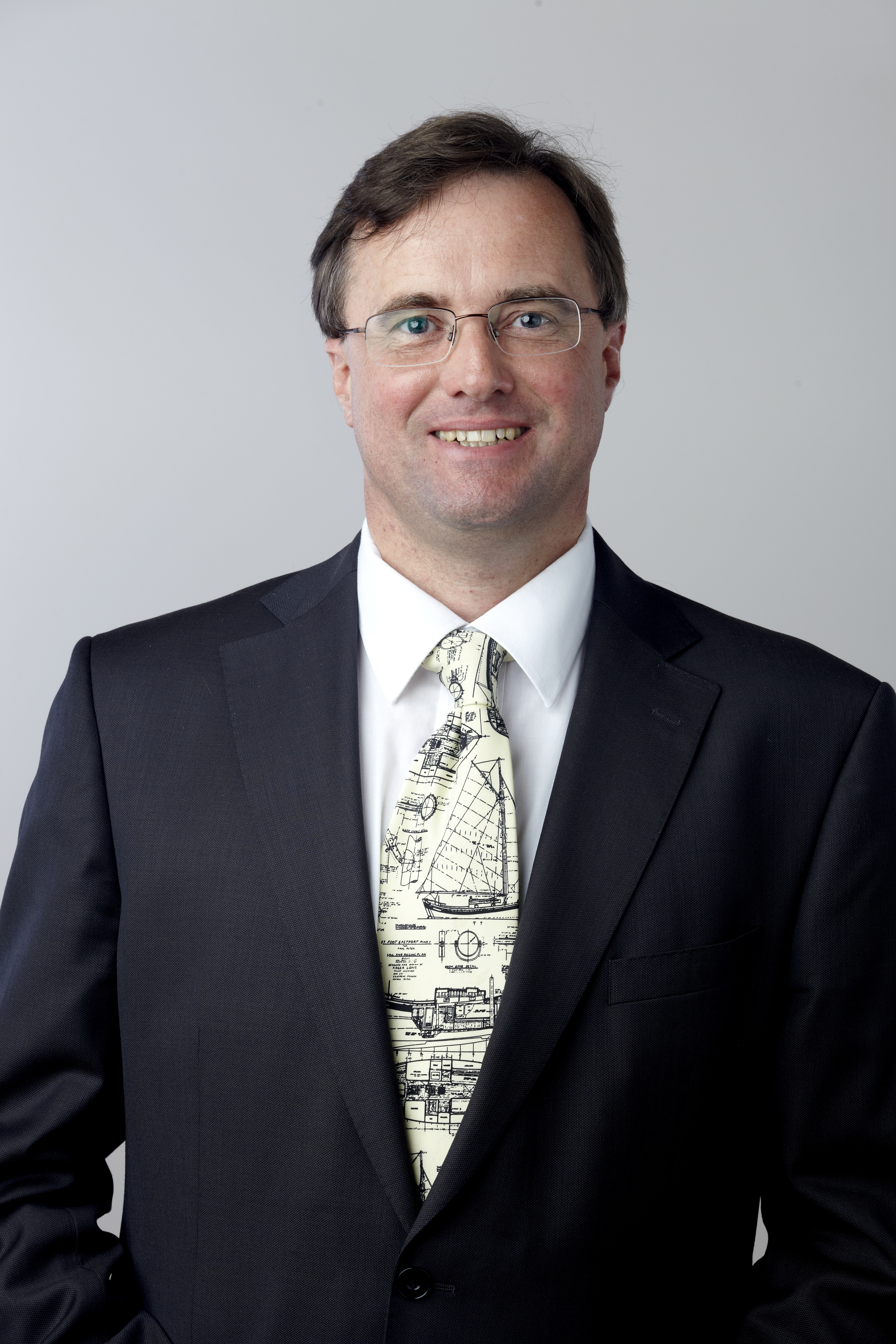
- Leighton in 2014
- Born: Timothy Grant Leighton; 16 October 1963 (age 62); Blackburn, Lancashire
- Education: Heversham Grammar School, Cumbria
- Alma mater: University of Cambridge
- Known for: The Acoustic Bubble
- Awards: Rayleigh Medal (2014); Clifford Paterson Lecture (2018)
- Scientific career
- Fields: Ultrasonics; Acoustics
- Institutions: Cavendish Laboratory; University of Cambridge; University of Southampton; University College London
- Thesis: Image intensifier studies of sonoluminescence, with application to the safe use of medical ultrasound (1988)
- Website: southampton.ac.uk/engineering/about/staff/tgl.page

Timothy Grant Leighton (born 16 October 1963) is a British scientist. He is the Executive General Director and Inventor-in-Chief of Sloan Water Technology Ltd., best known for his work in bubble acoustics, planetary acoustics and medical acoustics. He is a Fellow of the Royal Society, Fellow of the Academy of Medical Sciences, and Fellow of the Royal Academy of Engineering. He is emeritus professor of University of Southampton, Honorary Professor of University College London, and honorary fellow of Magdalene College at the University of Cambridge.

== Biography ==
Leighton received a double first class Bachelor of Arts degree with honours in physics and theoretical physics from Cambridge University in 1985, and in 1988 he earned his PhD at the Cavendish Laboratory, University of Cambridge. Leighton was affiliated with the Institute of Sound and Vibration Research, University of Southampton, from 1992 to 2024 as a lecturer in underwater acoustics and was awarded a personal chair by University of Southampton at the age of 35. He founded and led two research organisations with international membership (Global-NAMRIP and HEFUA).

== Extraterrestrial acoustics ==
Since the mid-2000s, Leighton attempted to increase interest in using sound to explore other planets by predicting the soundscapes of other worlds and how these could best be exploited using acoustic devices, led to devices for planetaria to use when teaching about other worlds, and showed how careful calculation was needed to avoid mistakes when using acoustic sensors on other worlds. Leighton supported the Mars Perseverance and Ingenuity missions.

== Public health ==
=== NAMRIP and Global-NAMRIP ===
In 2015, Leighton founded the Global Network for AntiMicrobial Resistance and Infection Prevention (Global-NAMRIP). Global-NAMRIP organised conferences, fostered collaborations and stimulated new areas of research, aimed at solutions that the end-users could implement for patients and public health. He is quoted as saying

We need to work with rigour, imagination, and wonder, unconstrained by the artificial boundaries set in place by discipline names, or the history of projects in which we have previously worked, or the tendency of sponsors to believe they can pick winners, or above all by the belief that we must jump to solutions when we have not yet perceived the real problem. Then, when we eventually do find a solution, we must have the will to push it through all the way to help others, and not simply publish in the expectation that someone will finish the job for us.

=== Health Effects of Ultrasound in Air ===
In 2015, Leighton founded the research group Health Effects of Ultrasound in Air (HEFUA). His aim was to map the increasing use of ultrasound in public places, and to investigate whether or not this increase is having adverse effects on some humans.

== Awards and honours ==
=== Medals ===
- the 2017 Clifford Paterson Lecture and Medal of the Royal Society (video of Lecture here)
- the 2014 Rayleigh Medal of the Institute of Acoustics
- the 2013 Helmholtz-Rayleigh Interdisciplinary Silver Medal of the Acoustical Society of America
- the 2009 R W B Stephens Medal of the Institute of Acoustics
- the 2006 Paterson Medal of the Institute of Physics
- the inaugural 2004 Early Career Medal and Award of the International Commission for Acoustics
- the 2002 Tyndall Medal of the Institute of Acoustics
- the 1994 A. B. Wood Medal of the Institute of Acoustics

=== Awards ===
- 2025 Doctor of Science (DSc), University of Southampton, with the citation 'For distinguished fundamental research, with extensive societal and humanitarian impact, in the study of climate change, the environment and safety, catastrophe relief, medical and healthcare research, extraterrestrial and planetary science, and the preservation and understanding of the oceans'.
- 2019 Doctor of Science, University of Cambridge
- 2018 Royal Society's Lord Leonard and Lady Estelle Wolfson Foundation Translation Award for the StarHealer
- the 2014 'Best new product of the year' award for StarStream
- the 2012 Institute of Chemical Engineering Award for Water Management and Supply
- the 2011 Royal Society Brian Mercer Award for Innovation
- the 2008 'Medical & Healthcare' award from 'The Engineer'
- the inaugural 2001 International Medwin Prize for Acoustical Oceanography from the Acoustical Society of America
- 2000 Royal Society Leverhulme Trust Senior Research Fellowship

=== Fellowships ===
Leighton is an Academician of three National Academies. He was elected a Fellow of the Institute of Physics (FInstP) in 2000, and was awarded Fellowships of the Institute of Acoustics in 1999, and the Acoustical Society of America in 1998, and Fellowship of the Cambridge Philosophical Society in 1988. He is a Visiting Fellow of the Institute of Advanced Studies of Loughborough University. In 2018, Professor Leighton became a Distinguished Fellow of the International Institute of Acoustics and Vibration (IIAV).
