= Trevor Cox =

English academic

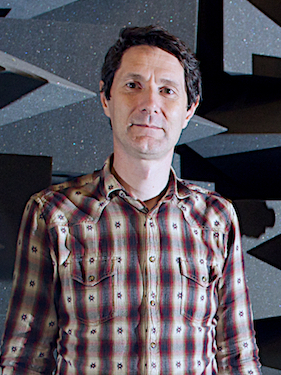
- Cox in the Anechoic chamber at the University of Salford in 2014
- Citizenship: British
- Education: University of Birmingham (BSc); University of Salford (PhD)
- Scientific career
- Fields: Acoustics
- Workplaces: University of Salford
- Website: trevorcox.me

Trevor Cox is an English academic and science communicator. He was a Senior Media fellow for EPSRC, and is a past-President of the Institute of Acoustics.

== Academia ==
Cox holds a degree in Physics and a PhD in Acoustics. He entered the field of acoustics because of an interest in music and his science background. He has been an academic in Acoustics Department at the University of Salford since 1995 and currently holds the position of Professor of Acoustic Engineering.

Cox is fascinated by room acoustics, and how places can be designed for intelligible speech (for example, classrooms) and beautiful music (for example, auditoria). His acoustic designs can be found in rooms worldwide and he has co-authored a research book on absorbers and diffusers which is now in its third edition. He was an associate editor for an international journal of acoustics (Acta Acustica united with Acustica).

He uses both qualitative methods (focus groups, interviews, sound-walks) and quantitative methods (perceptual testing in laboratories and over the Internet) to explore responses to sounds from products (such as washing machines), in outdoor spaces (such as cities) and various sound types (such as horrible sounds). He was director of ‘A Noisy Future?’, an ‘Ideas Factory’ research programme run by the Engineering and Physical Sciences Research Council. He was award the Institute of Acoustics's Tyndall Medal in 2004.

== Popular science books ==
- Sonic Wonderland (Bodley Head, UK 2014)
- The Sound Book (W.W.Norton, US 2014)
- Now You're Talking (UK: Bodley Head, US: Counterpoint press 2018)

== Broadcasting ==
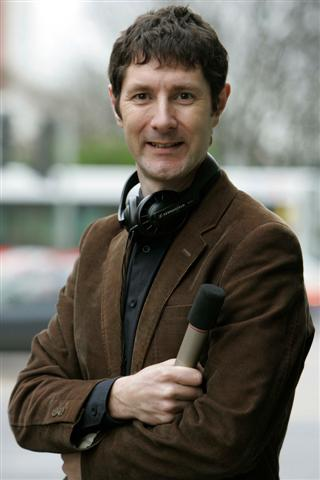
Cox in 2007

Cox has presented a range of popular science documentaries for BBC Radio 4, BBC Radio 3 and BBC World Service, including Sounds of Science, Aural Architecture, Life’s Soundtrack, Science vs Strad, The Pleasure of Noise, World Musical Instruments, Dragon's Lab, Biomimicry and Save our Sounds. He was co-originator and judge of BBC Radio 4’ ‘So You Want To Be A Scientist?’, a competition to find Britain’s best amateur scientist. He has appeared on Inside Science.

He is host of the Inventive Podcast, mixing Engineering Fact and Fiction.

== Media coverage ==
Since the 1990s, Cox has been communicating acoustic engineering to the public working on projects worth over £1 million. He was given the Institute of Acoustics award for promoting acoustics to the public in 2009. He was a finalist at Famelab, a ‘Pop Idol’-style competition to find science communicators for television. He has been involved in projects to produce teaching resources for pupils, the last having reached more than a quarter of a million pupils. He has developed and presented science shows seen by 17,000 pupils, including appearances in London at the Royal Albert Hall, the Purcell Rooms at the South Bank Centre and the Royal Institution. At one stage, he held the Guinness World Record for the world’s largest whoopee cushion, based on a stage prop used at the "Beautiful Music – Horrible Sounds" show. He set the Guinness World Record for the 'Longest echo' in the Inchindown oil tanks.

He has gained worldwide news coverage for stories such as "Does a duck quack echo?" and "The Worst Sound in the World". He has also investigated the World's scariest scream. In addition, he has appeared in features on BBC1, Teachers TV, Discovery and National Geographic channels, and as an expert in news items on a variety of television and radio channels.
