= Institute of Acoustics (United Kingdom) =

British professional engineering institution

- Formation: 1974
- Type: Professional body / Learned society
- Headquarters: Milton Keynes, United Kingdom
- Members: ~3,000
- President: David Waddington
- Website: www.ioa.org.uk

The Institute of Acoustics (IOA) is a British professional engineering institution founded in 1974. It is licensed by the Engineering Council UK to assess candidates for inclusion on ECUK's Register of professional Engineers. The institute's address is Silbury Court, 406 Silbury Boulevard, Milton Keynes MK9 2AF, United Kingdom. The current president of the IOA is David Waddington. Past presidents include Alistair Somerville, Barry Gibbs, John Hinton OBE, Colin English, David Weston, Tony Jones, Professor Trevor Cox, William Egan, Professor Bridget Shield, and Jo Webb.

== History ==
In 1963 a Society of Acoustic Technology was formed in the UK for those interested in this subject: the President was Elfyn Richards. Because of the interest in establishing a professional body, meetings were held with various societies and institutions, and in 1965 a British Acoustical Society was set up, absorbing the earlier society. In 1974 the British Acoustical Society amalgamated with the Acoustics Group of the Institute of Physics to form the Institute of Acoustics.

== Specialist groups ==
- Building acoustics
- Electroacoustics
- Environmental noise
- Measurement and instrumentation
- Musical acoustics
- Noise and vibration engineering
- Physical acoustics
- Speech and hearing
- Underwater acoustics

== Medals and awards ==
The following prizes are awarded by the Institute

- Rayleigh Medal
- Tyndall Medal
- A B Wood Medal
- R W B Stephens Medal
- IOA Engineering Medal
- Honorary fellowship
- Peter Barnett Memorial Award
- The Award for Promoting Acoustics to the Public
- Award for Services to the Institute
- IOA Young Persons' Award for Innovation in Acoustical Engineering
- IOA Prize for best diploma student
- ANC prize for the best diploma project
- ANC prize for the best paper at an IOA conference

In 2025, the Rayleigh Medal was awarded to Phillip Joseph, and the R W B Stephens Medal to Simon Chandler-Wilde

== See also ==
- Chartered engineer
- Incorporated engineer
- The Association of Noise Consultants
