= Outline of acoustics =

Overview of and topical guide to acoustics

The following outline is provided as an overview of and topical guide to acoustics:

Acoustics – interdisciplinary science that deals with the study of all mechanical waves in gases, liquids, and solids including topics such as vibration, sound, ultrasound and infrasound. A scientist who works in the field of acoustics is an acoustician while someone working in the field of acoustics technology may be called an acoustical engineer. The application of acoustics is present in almost all aspects of modern society with the most obvious being the audio and noise control industries.

== Branches of acoustics ==
- Archaeoacoustics – study of sound within archaeology. This typically involves studying the acoustics of archaeological sites and artefacts.
- Aeroacoustics – study of noise generated by air movement, for instance via turbulence, and the movement of sound through the fluid air. This knowledge is applied in acoustical engineering to study how to quieten aircraft. Aeroacoustics is important to understanding how wind musical instruments work.
- Architectural acoustics – science of how to achieve a good sound within a building. It typically involves the study of speech intelligibility, speech privacy and music quality in the built environment. Also known as building acoustics.
- Bioacoustics – scientific study of the hearing and calls of animal calls, as well as how animals are affected by the acoustic and sounds of their habitat.
- Electroacoustics – concerned with the recording, manipulation and reproduction of audio using electronics. This might include products such as mobile phones, large scale public address systems or virtual reality systems in research laboratories.
- Environmental noise – concerned with noise and vibration caused by railways, road traffic, aircraft, industrial equipment and recreational activities. The main aim of these studies is to reduce levels of environmental noise and vibration. Research work now also has a focus on the positive use of sound in urban and natural environments: soundscapes and tranquility.
- Musical acoustics – study of the physics of acoustic instruments; the audio signal processing used in electronic music; the computer analysis of music and composition, and the perception and cognitive neuroscience of music.
- Psychoacoustics – study of how humans respond to sounds.
- Acoustic signal processing – electronic manipulation of acoustic signals. Applications include: active noise control; design for hearing aids or cochlear implants; echo cancellation; music information retrieval, and perceptual coding (e.g. MP3 or Opus).
- Acoustics of speech – acousticians study the production, processing and perception of speech. Speech recognition and Speech synthesis are two important areas of speech processing using computers. The subject also overlaps with the disciplines of physics, physiology, psychology, and linguistics.
- Ultrasound – Ultrasonics deals with sounds at frequencies too high to be heard by humans. Specialisms include medical ultrasonics (including medical ultrasonography), sonochemistry, material characterisation and underwater acoustics (Sonar).
- Underwater acoustics – scientific study of natural and man-made sounds underwater. Applications include sonar to locate submarines, underwater communication by whales, climate change monitoring by measuring sea temperatures acoustically, sonic weapons, and marine bioacoustics.
- Acoustics of vibration – study of how mechanical systems vibrate and interact with their surroundings. Applications might include: ground vibrations from railways; vibration isolation to reduce vibration in operating theatres; studying how vibration can damage health (vibration white finger); vibration control to protect a building from earthquakes, or measuring how structure-borne sound moves through buildings.

== Acoustic software ==
- Baudline
- Beatmapping
- Composers Desktop Project
- Enhanced Acoustic Simulator for Engineers
- Kyma (sound design language)
- NU-Tech
- Scratch Live
- Unit generator
- Vinyl emulation software

== Acoustics publications ==
- Applied Acoustics
- Journal of Sound and Vibration
- Journal of the Acoustical Society of America
- Ultrasonics

== Influential acoustician ==
Christian Andrews Doppler

Lord Rayleigh

James Lighthill

== See also ==
- Sound
- Wave
