= Nazanin =

- Pronunciation: nāh-zah-NEEN
- Gender: Female

Origin
- Origin: Persian
- Meaning: Sweetheart, lovely
- Region of origin: Iran (Persia)

Other names
- Related names: Nāz, Nāzli, Nāzi, Nāzdār

Nazanin (Persian: نَازَنِین, romanized: Nāzanīn, lit. 'sweetheart, lovely, darling, delightful', Persian pronunciation: [naː.za.ˈniːn]) and also spelt Nazenin, Naznin or Nazneen, is a Persian female given name in Iran, Afghanistan, Azerbaijan, Turkey, Pakistan and India. Notable people with the name include:

== Given name ==
- Nazanin Afshin-Jam (born 1979), Iranian-born Canadian human rights activist, singer/songwriter, Miss World Canada 2003
- Nazanin Aghakhani (born 1980), Austrian-born orchestral conductor
- Nazenin Ansari, Iranian journalist
- Nazanin Bassiri-Gharb, mechanical engineer in the U.S.
- Nazanin Boniadi (born 1980), Iranian-born British actress and an official spokesperson for Amnesty International
- Nazanin Fatehi (born 1987), Iranian woman sentenced to death for stabbing her attacker
- Nazanin Mandi (born 1986), American model, actress, and singer
- Nazanin Nour (born 1982), Iranian-American actress and writer
- Nazanin Zaghari-Ratcliffe (born 1978), 2016–2022 British-Iranian prisoner in Iran
