= Nanomanufacturing =

Nanomanufacturing is both the production of nanoscaled materials, which can be powders or fluids, and the manufacturing of parts "bottom up" from nanoscaled materials or "top down" in smallest steps for high precision, used in several technologies such as laser ablation, etching and others. Nanomanufacturing differs from molecular manufacturing, which is the manufacture of complex, nanoscale structures by means of nonbiological mechanosynthesis (and subsequent assembly).

The term "nanomanufacturing" is widely used, e.g. by the European Technology Platform MINAM and the U.S. National Nanotechnology Initiative (NNI). The NNI refers to the sub-domain of nanotechnology as one of its five "priority areas." There is also a nanomanufacturing program at the U.S. National Science Foundation, through which the National Nanomanufacturing Network (NNN) has been established. The NNN is an organization that works to expedite the transition of nanotechnologies from laboratory research to production manufacturing and it does so through information exchange, strategic workshops, and roadmap development.

The NNI has defined nanotechnology very broadly, to include a wide range of tiny structures, including those created by large and imprecise tools. However, nanomanufacturing is not defined in the NNI's recent report, Instrumentation and Metrology for Nanotechnology. In contrast, another "priority area," nanofabrication, is defined as "the ability to fabricate, by directed or self-assembly methods, functional structures or devices at the atomic or molecular level" (p. 67). Nanomanufacturing appears to be the near-term, industrial-scale manufacture of nanotechnology-based objects, with emphasis on low cost and reliability. Many professional societies have formed Nanotechnology technical groups. The Society of Manufacturing Engineers, for example, has formed a Nanomanufacturing Technical Group to both inform members of the developing technologies and to address the organizational and IP (intellectual property) legal issues that must be addressed for broader commercialization.

In 2014 the Government Accountability Office noted that America's leadership in nanotechnology was put at risk by a failure of the government to invest in preparing basic research for commercial application.

== Background ==
The realization of the numerous applications and benefits of nano-scale systems in everyday materials, electronics, medicine, energy conservation, sustainability, and transportation has led to research in developing techniques to produce these nano-systems on a larger-scale and at higher rates. Programs and organizations like the NNI and NNN are currently funding research towards designing economic, sustainable and reliable industry-scale nanomanufacturing techniques.

An example of such technology is the Nanoscale Offset Printing System (NanoOps) which was developed by researchers at the Center of High-rate Nanomanufacturing (CHN) in Northeastern University. The NanoOps is a form of directed assembly which is faster and more economic than traditional 3D printing of nanosystems. Ahmed Busnaina, who was the head lead of the project and featured in the film From Lab to Fab: Pioneers in Nano-manufacturing describes the system as a printing press. An etched template with nano wires is dipped in a solution with nano particles which acts as the ink for the press. The nanoparticles adhere to the template when electricity is applied to the solution. The template with the attached nano particles can then be taken out of the solution and pressed onto any material of choice. According to Busnaina, the whole process only costs 1% of conventional manufacturing and can reduce manufacturing time from days to minutes.

Another illustrative example is the soft-template infiltration manufacturing technique developed by Nazanin Bassiri-Gharb at Georgia Institute of Technology. This is a bottom-up nanomanufacturing technique for the fabrication of ferroelectric, piezoelectrically-active nanotubes. The method uses electron beam lithography to draw a vacuum on the precursor sol-gel solution, thereby creating a polymeric template. Via this highly scalable and practical manufacturing process the user can produce custom patterns and shapes for numerous applications.

== General overview ==
Nanomanufacturing refers to manufacturing processes of objects or material with dimensions between one and one hundred nanometers. These processes results in nanotechnology, extremely small devices, structures, features, and systems that have applications in organic chemistry, molecular biology, aerospace engineering, physics, and beyond. Nanomanufacturing enables the creation of new materials and products that have applications such as material removal processes, device assembly, medical devices, electrostatic coating and fibers, and lithography. Nanomanufacturing is a relatively recent branch of manufacturing that represents both a new field of science and also a new marketplace. Research in nanomanufacturing, unlike tradition manufacturing, requires collective effort across typical engineering divides, such as collaboration between mechanical engineers, physicists, biologists, chemists, and material scientists.

Nanomanufacturing can generally be broken down into two categories: top-down and bottom-up approaches.

== Nanomanufacturing industry ==
In 2009, $91 billion was in US products that incorporate nanoscale components. More than 60 countries established nanomanufacturing industry related programs at a national level between 2001 and 2004. Cumulative funding since 2000 for National Nanotechnology Initiative (NNI) is more than $12 billion.

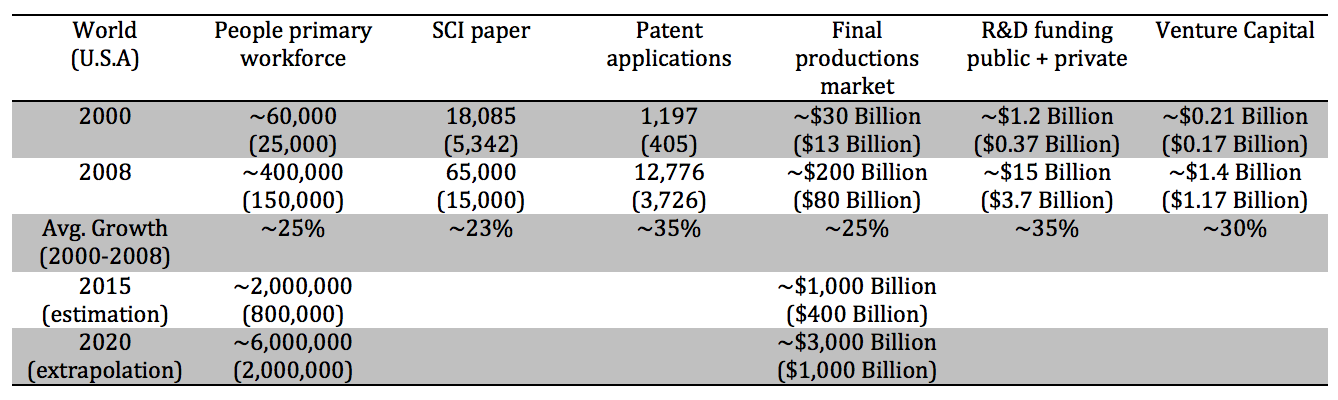
Table. 1 Nanotechnology Development in the Worlds and U.S.

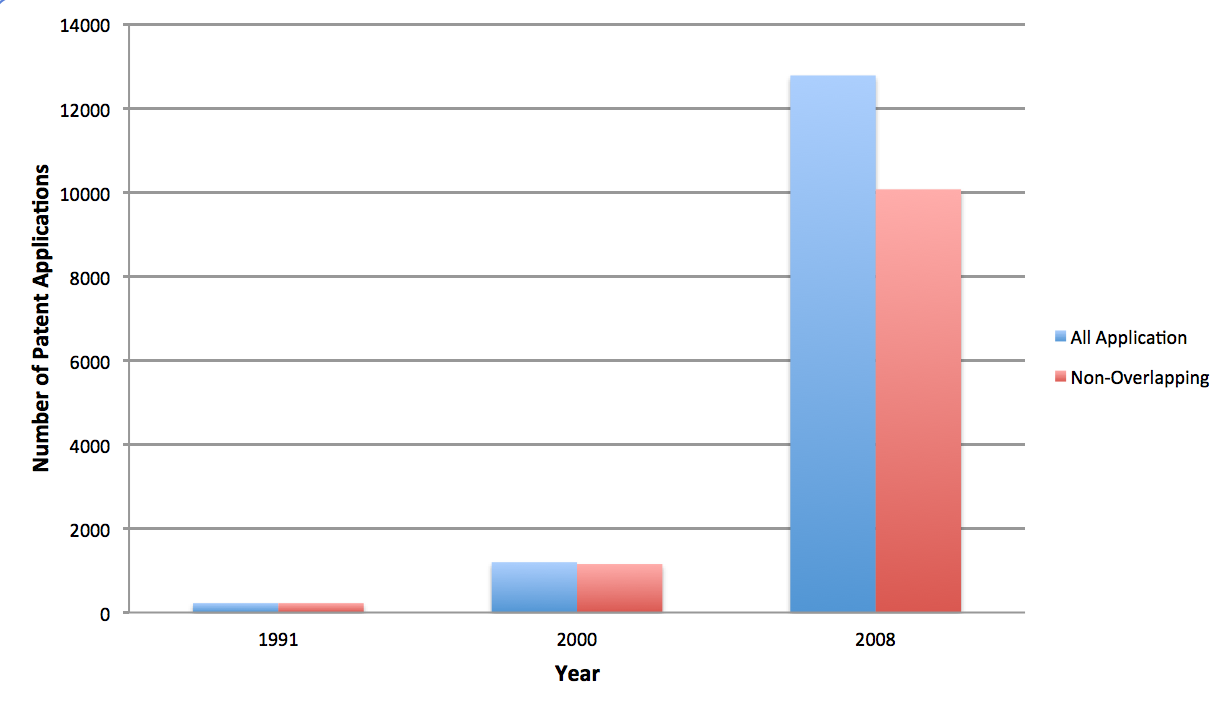
Figure.1 Number of nanotechnology related and non-overlapping application patents.

For sustainability point of view, Atomic Layer Deposition (ALD) is a Nano-scale manufacturing technology using bottom-up and chemical vapor deposition (CVD) manufacturing method. ALD replaces SiO_{2} dielectric film with Al_{2}O_{3} dielectric film. ALD industry is already in use in Semiconductor industry and promising in solar cells, fuel cells, medical device, sensor, polymer industries. Nanomanufacturing technology allow improvements in food packaging. For example, improvement in plastic material barrier allow customers to identify relevant information. Longer food life and safer food is aimed with self repairing functions as well. Performance of traditional construction materials; steel and concrete improves with nanotechnology. Reinforcing concrete with metal oxide nanoparticle reduces permeability and increase strength. Property of high tensile strength and Young’s modulus of Nanocarbon additions such as Carbon nanotubes (CNTs) and Carbon nanofibers (CNFs), creates denser and less porous material.

== Challenges of nanomanufacturing ==
The transitioning of nanotechnology from lab demonstrations to industrial-scale manufacturing has a number of challenges, some of which include:

- Developing production techniques that are economic and produce viable yield
- Controlling the precision of the assembly of nanostructures
- Testing reliability and establishing methods for defect control. Currently, defect control in the semiconductor industry is non-selective and takes 20-25% of the total manufacturing time. Removal of defects for nano-scale system is projected to take up much more time because it requires selective and careful removal of impurities.
- Maintaining nano-scale properties and quality of nano-system during high-rate and high volume production as well as during the lifetime of the product after production
- Assessing the environmental, ethical and social impacts
