= Bundengan =

Indonesian musical instrument

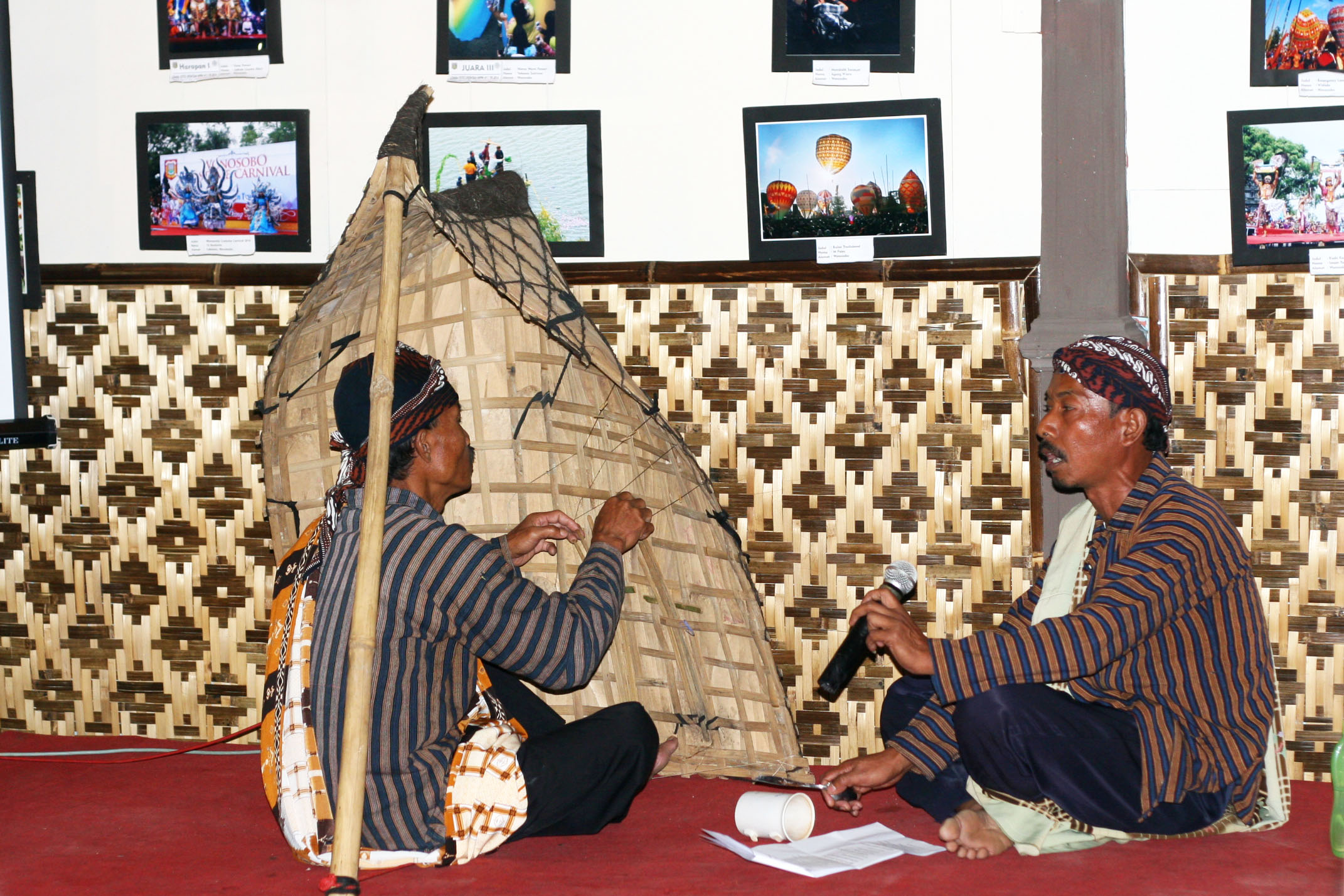
- Bundengan during a performance in 2014.
- Classification: String Instrument
- Hornbostel–Sachs classification: Frame zither

The bundengan is a musical instrument with plucked strings and percussion elements, practiced on the island of Java in Indonesia.

== Description ==
Bundengan is a traditional musical instrument from the Wonosobo region in Central Java, Indonesia. It combines plucked strings and percussion-like elements and is constructed using woven bamboo material called kowangan used as a shelter or shield by duck herders. When the kowangan is converted into a bundengan, strings are attached inside the woven body, and thin bamboo blades are inserted into its lattice structure to supplement the sound.

== Sources ==
- Parikesit, Gea Oswah Fatah; Kusumaningtyas, Indraswari (2017). "The illusive sound of a Bundengan string". Physics Education. 52 (5): 055007. Bibcode:2017PhyEd..52e5007P. doi:10.1088/1361-6552/aa7f09. ISSN 0031-9120..
- Arbi, Bahtiar; Sumaryanto, Totok; Utomo, Udi (2017). "Bundengan: Between Aesthetics Expressivism, Social of Reality, and Performance Studies". Catharsis. 6 (2). doi:10.15294/catharsis.v6i2.19287 (inactive 11 July 2025). ISSN 2252-6900..
- Parikesit, Gea Oswah Fatah; Kusumaningtyas, Indraswari (2019). "Vibration of clipped strings in the bundengan musical instrument". Applied Acoustics. 155: 204–215. doi:10.1016/j.apacoust.2019.06.011. ISSN 0003-682X..
