= Aghakhani =

Aghakhani is a surname. Notable people with the surname include:

- Nazanin Aghakhani (born 1980), Austrian conductor
- Saeed Aghakhani (born 1972), Iranian actor and director
