= Voloshinov =

Voloshinov, Волошинов (feminine: Voloshinova) is a Russian surname. Notable people with the surname include:

- Valentin Voloshinov (1895–1936) Soviet and Russian linguist
- Vitaly Voloshinov (1947–2019), Soviet and Russian physicist
