= Della Roy =

American materials scientist (1926–2001)

Della Marie Martin Roy (1926–2021) was an American materials scientist who worked for more than 50 years at Pennsylvania State University. She was "an international leader in the field of cement and concrete research", including the reduction of greenhouse gas emissions from cement production; she was also known for her work on radioactive waste disposal, on the industrial uses of coal combustion products obtained as waste from other processes, on methods for converting coral into hydroxyapatite while preserving its porous structure, and on applications of converted coral in medical implants.

== Early life and education ==
Della Marie Martin was born on November 3, 1926, in Merrill, Oregon. She completed high school at age 16, and majored in chemistry at the University of Oregon, where she graduated phi beta kappa in 1947.

Next, she traveled to Pennsylvania State University for graduate study in mineralogy, working there under the supervision of Elburt F. Osborn. As a graduate student, she shared an office with Indian-born physicist Rustum Roy; they married in 1948. They moved to India but returned to Penn State in 1950. Rustum Roy took a faculty position there while Della Roy continued her graduate program, completing her Ph.D. in 1952.

== Career and later life ==
After earning a doctorate, Roy stated at Pennsylvania State University as a faculty member. She became a full professor in 1975, and retired as professor emerita in 2012 after more than 50 years at the university. In her retirement, she took a second position as research professor at Arizona State University, with a part-time appointment shared jointly between the university's School of Sustainable Engineering and the Built Environment and its School of Mechanical Aerospace, Chemical and Materials.

Roy and fellow Penn State faculty member Kathleen Mourant founded the journal Cement and Concrete Research in 1971; Roy remained its editor-in-chief until 2005.

== Recognition ==
The American Ceramic Society (ACerS) named her a Distinguished Life Member and Fellow. She was the 1982 recipient of the Jeppson Medal of The American Ceramic Society, the 1987 recipient of the L. E. Copeland Award of the ACerS Cements Division, the 2004 recipient of the Bleininger Award of The American Ceramic Society, and the namesake of the ACerS Della Roy Lecturer Award, given annually since 2000.

Her work on the use of coral in bone implants was awarded by an inaugural Golden Goose Award of the US Congress in 2012. She was also an elected member of the World Academy of Ceramics (its first woman member, elected in 1991) and an honorary member of the Institute for Concrete Technology (elected in 1987).

She was elected to the National Academy of Engineering in 1987, cited "for internationally recognized contributions to applied science and engineering of cement and concrete". She was its first female material scientist and the first women from Penn State elected to the academy.

Dellaite, a rare naturally occurring mineral, was named after her in 1965. It is a calcium silicate hydrate (in the same family of compounds used for Portland cement), with the chemical formula Ca_{6}(Si_{2}O_{7})(SiO_{4})(OH)_{2}, discovered in metamorphosed Scotland limestone, and synthesized in the laboratory by Roy.

== Selected publications ==
In Memorial Tributes: National Academy of Engineering, Susan Trolier-McKinstry identifies the following as "among the most important" of Roy's publications, which numbered over 400 in total:

- Roy, Della M.; Linnehan, Sari Kurtossy (January 1974), "Hydroxyapatite formed from coral skeletal carbonate by hydrothermal exchange", Nature, 247 (5438): 220–222, Bibcode:1974Natur.247..220R, doi:10.1038/247220a0, PMID 4149289, S2CID 4205053
- Chiroff, Richard T.; White, Eugene W.; Weber, Jon N.; Roy, Della M. (July 1975), "Tissue ingrowth of replamineform implants", Journal of Biomedical Materials Research, 9 (4): 29–45, doi:10.1002/jbm.820090407, PMID 1176509
- Roy, Della M. (February 1987), "New strong cement materials: chemically bonded ceramics", Science, 235 (4789): 651–658, Bibcode:1987Sci...235..651R, doi:10.1126/science.235.4789.651, PMID 17833626, S2CID 22611277
- Gougar, M. L. D.; Scheetz, B. E.; Roy, D. M. (January 1996), "Ettringite and C–S–H Portland cement phases for waste ion immobilization: A review", Waste Management, 16 (4): 295–303, doi:10.1016/s0956-053x(96)00072-4
- Roy, D. M.; Arjunan, P.; Silsbee, M. R. (December 2001), "Effect of silica fume, metakaolin, and low-calcium fly ash on chemical resistance of concrete", Cement and Concrete Research, 31 (12): 1809–1813, doi:10.1016/s0008-8846(01)00548-8

As well, she was coauthor of two books:

- Roy, Rustum; Roy, Della (1968), Honest Sex, New American Library
- Shi, Caijun; Roy, Della; Krivenko, Pavel (2006), Alkali-Activated Cements and Concretes, Taylor & Francis, ISBN 9781482266900
