= Center for High-rate Nanomanufacturing =

Research center at Northeastern University

Coordinates: 42.3376°N 71.0890°W

The Center for High-rate Nanomanufacturing (CHN) at Northeastern University provides capabilities for the fabrication and study of nano-products, nanoscale materials and nanoscale manufacturing processes. Established in 2004 by the National Science Foundation, the CHN's nanomanufacturing research program is creating new processes for making nanoproducts and aiding in the design of specific nanoproducts, such as sensors, biomedical devices, or batteries.

The NSF Nanoscale Science and Engineering Center for High-rate Nanomanufacturing (CHN) is one of four nanoscale engineering research centers funded by the NSF. Since 2004, the CHN has carried out over $50 million in research funded by NSF, government agencies, foundations and the private sector. It has affiliated scientists and researchers at Northeastern University, University of Massachusetts-Lowell, University of New Hampshire, Michigan State University and the Museum of Science. The founding director and principal investigator is Dr. Ahmed Busnaina.

Research is carried out in several fields: directed assembly and transfer of nanoparticle, environmental health & safety for nanomanufacturing, and regulatory & ethical issues related to nanoproducts.
