= Pettifor =

Pettifor is an English surname. The name comes from the Old French nickname "pied de fer", meaning "Iron Foot". People with this name include:

- Ann Pettifor (born 1947), British debt-relief activist, economist, and author
- David Pettifor (1945–2017), British metallurgist and professor

== See also ==
- Pettifer
- Pettiford
