= Vitaly Voloshinov =

Soviet-Russian physicist (1947–2019)

- Вита́лий Бори́сович Воло́шинов
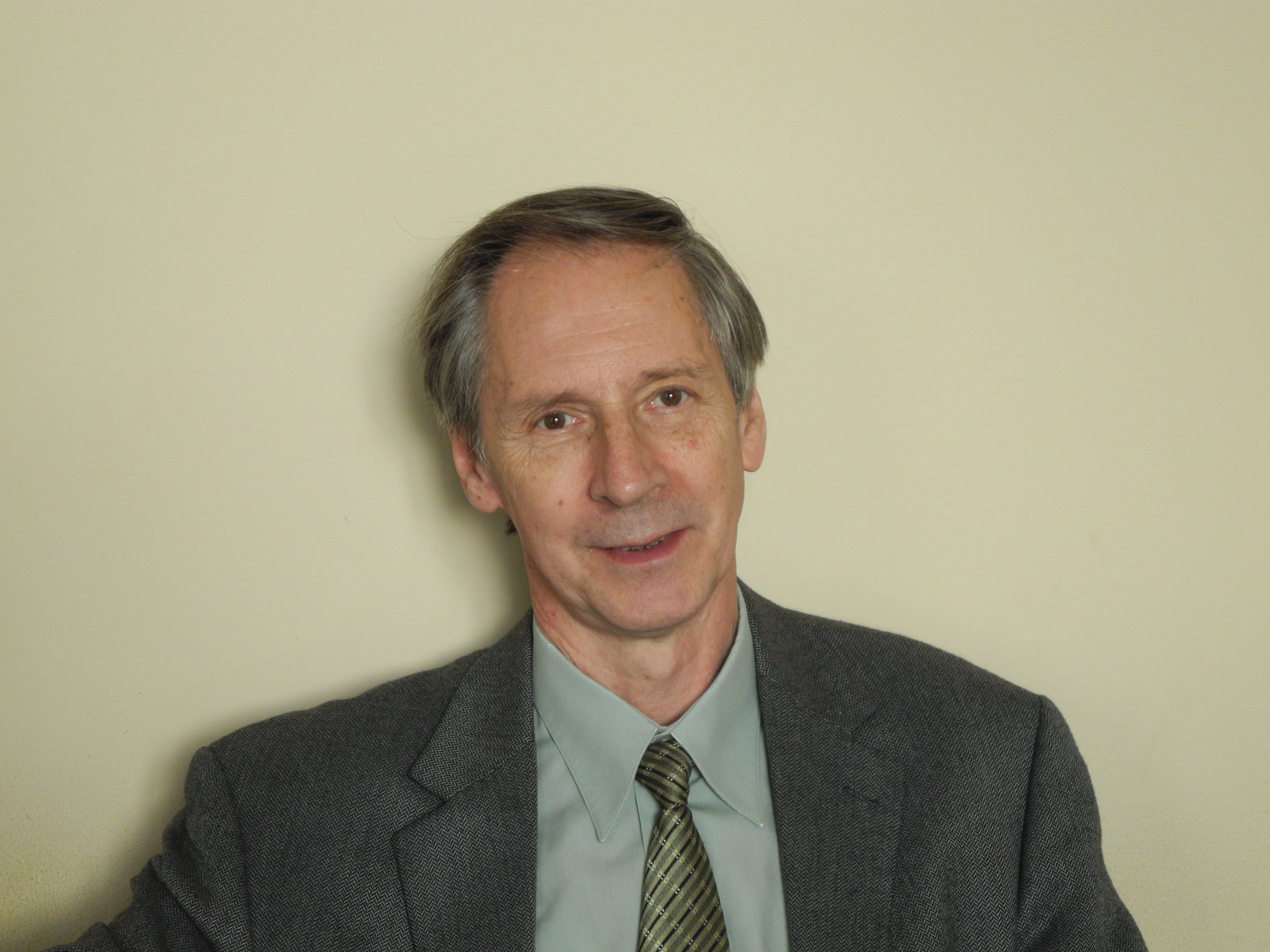
- Born: 20 March 1947; Berlin, Germany
- Died: 28 September 2019 (aged 72); Moscow, Russian Federation
- Citizenship: Soviet Union, Russia
- Education: Moscow State University
- Scientific career
- Fields: Physics, Acousto-optics, Electro-optics, Optical telecommunication, Laser Technology
- Workplaces: Moscow State University
- Doctoral advisor: Vladimir Parygin
- Doctoral students: Nataly Polikarpova
- Website: acousto-optics.phys.msu.ru/page-staff.html

Vitaly Borisovich Voloshinov (Russian: Виталий Борисович Волошинов; 20 March 1947 – 28 September 2019) was a Soviet and Russian physicist, one of the world's leading experts in the field of acoustoptics, honored teacher of Moscow State University

PhD in physics and mathematics, associate professor Physics Department, Moscow State University.

Consists of Corps of Experts in Natural Sciences, with 1683 citations for papers published after 1976. H-index – 19.

== Biography ==
Vitaly B. Voloshinov was born on 20 March 1947 in Berlin. Son of Boris E. Voloshinov and Nataliya K. Voloshinova.

In 1965 he graduated from English special school No.1 in Moscow and music school No.1 named after Sergey Prokofiev.

In 1971 he graduated from the Physics Department of Lomonosov Moscow State University with Highest Distinction and Prize named after Rem Khokhlov for best Graduate Student Research Projects.

In 1971–1973 he worked as an engineer and senior research engineer at the Scientific Research Institute of Space Engineering Instruments.

In 1977, upon completion of graduate school, defended his thesis on "Control of light beams using Bragg diffraction in an optically anisotropic medium", specialty No. 01.04.03, PhD in Radiophysics and Quantum Electronics.

Since 1976, a researcher at the physics department.

Since 1992, an associate professor at the physics department.

He died suddenly on 28 September 2019. The funeral service took place in the church of the Exaltation of the Holy Cross in Mitino. He was buried at Mitinsky cemetery in Moscow.

== Achievements ==
Achievements include 7 national patents for inventions in optical engineering.

Scientific supervisor of national and international research projects and grants (CRDF, RFBR, etc.).

=== Principle results of the investigation ===
- Prediction, observation and analysis of multiple Bragg acousto-optic interaction with a simultaneous existence of two, three and seven diffraction orders additionally to zero diffraction maximum (1973–1989). Examination of regular trends of light diffraction by ultrasound in case of double-frequency acoustic driving signal (1988).
- Experimental observation in media with induced optical anisotropy of Raman-Nath and intermediate between Bragg and Raman-Nath regimes of anisotropic light diffraction by acoustic waves (1980).
- Design and development of the first Russian tunable acousto-optic filter with a non-collinear geometry of light and hypersound interaction taking place in lithium niobate single crystal (1974). Realisation of electronic as well as of mechanic tuning of the filter over wide range of optical frequencies (1975). Design and development of acousto-optic cells of modulators and filters providing principle possibility of operation with arbitrary polarized monochromatic and non-monochromatic optical radiation (1986).
- Experimental confirmation of the possibility of filtrate non-collimated optical rays and beams forming optical images in visible light, near and middle infrared regions of spectrum (1983–1989). Development of the tunable acousto-optical filter with the extremely wide angular optical aperture up to $52^\circ$ (1989). Confirmation of the possibility of spectral-polarization analysis of optical rays in visible and infrared regions of spectrum by means of a single acousto-optic cell (1991).
- Development of filters of spatial frequencies for processing of optical images of coherent light (1986–1988). Invention of acousto-optical tunable filter providing effective selection of spatial frequencies along two orthogonal directions simultaneously (1988).
- Prediction and observation of quasi-collinear regime of acousto-optical diffraction of light by acoustic waves propagating in optically and acoustically anisotropic media (1990). Observation of the quasi-collinear regime of diffraction in the efficient acousto-optic material tellurium dioxide (1991). Realisation of the possibility to control electronically spectral transmission bandwidth of acousto-optic filter on base of paratellurite(1993). Observation electro-optic tuning of Bragg phase-matching frequency in the filter (1996)
- Prediction and observation of unknown regimes of Raman-Nath diffraction of light by ultrasound propagating in media with strong acoustic anisotropy (1997). Experimental observation of unusual propagation and reflection of acoustic wave in anisotropic crystals (1998).

== Teaching activities ==
Prepared 15 candidates of sciences(PhD).

Professor Voloshinov gave lectures to Graduate and Post-graduate Students of MSU on the following educational courses:

- “Physical Basics of Electrooptics and Acousto-optics”,
- “Modern Problems of Acousto-optics”,
- “Acousto-optic Interaction in Anisotropic Media”,
- “Optical communication”,
- Workshop on the physics of oscillations.

He also gave invited lectures in Russia, Bulgaria, Vietnam, Poland, Belgium, France, China, Colombia, (Germany) and United States.

== Selected publications ==
- Voloshinov, V. B.; Parygin, V. N. (1981). "Raman-Nath diffraction of light by ltrasonic in optacally anisotropic media". Technical Physics Journal Letters. 7 (3): 145–148.
- Voloshinov, V. B.; Mironov, O. V. (1990). "Wide angular acousto-optic filter for middle infrared region of spectrum". Optics and Spectroscopy. 68 (2): 452–457.
- Voloshinov, V. B. (1992). "Close to collinear acousto-optical interaction in paratellurite". Optical Engineering. 31 (10): 2089–2094. Bibcode:1992OptEn..31.2089V. doi:10.1117/12.58877.
- Voloshinov, V. B. (1993). "Anisotropic light diffraction in tellurium dioxide single crystal". Ultrasonics. 31 (5): 333–338. doi:10.1016/0041-624X(93)90066-9.
- Voloshinov, V. B.; Molchanov, V. Y.; Mosquera, J. C. (1996). "Spectral and Polarization Analysis of images by means of Acousto-Optics". Optics and Laser Technology. 28 (2): 119–127. doi:10.1016/0030-3992(95)00079-8.
- Voloshinov, V.; Gupta, N. (2004). "Ultraviolet-visible imaging acousto-optic tunable filters in KDP". Applied Optics. 43 (19): 3901–9. Bibcode:2004ApOpt..43.3901V. doi:10.1364/AO.43.003901. PMID 15250556.
- Voloshinov, V. B.; Polikarpova, N. V.; ivanova, Polina; Khorkin, V. S. (2018). "Acousto-optic control of internal acoustic reflection in tellurium dioxide crystal in case of strong elastic energy walkoff [Invited]". Applied Optics. 57 (10): C19–C25. Bibcode:2018ApOpt..57C..19V. doi:10.1364/ao.57.000c19. PMID 29714268.
- Information in the Scopus database
- Information in the Google Scholar database

== Honours ==
- Prize name after A. S. Popov (1973)
- Medal "In Commemoration of the 850th Anniversary of Moscow" (1995)
- Honorary Professor of the International Science Foundation (1997)
- Honorary Teacher of the Lomonosov Moscow State University (2007)
