= Pettifer =

Pettifer is an English surname. Variants include Pettipher, Pettyfer, Pettefer, Petifer, Pettifor, Pettifar, Pettafor, Pettyfor, Pettiford, Petford, Pettefar, Pettiver, Puddifer, Puddepha, and Pot(t)iphar (altered by folk etymology to conform to the name of Pharaoh's captain of the guard in Genesis chapter 39). The name Pettifer comes from the Old French nickname "pied de fer", meaning "Iron Foot".

Notable people with the surname include:

- Alex Pettyfer (born 1990), English actor
- Arran Pettifer (born 2003), English footballer
- Brian Pettifer (born 1949), British actor
- Carl Pettefer (born 1981), English footballer
- James Pettifer, British academic, writer and journalist
- Julian Pettifer (born 1935), English television journalist
- Joel Pettyfer (born 1987), English wrestler, known as Joel Redman
- Julian Barratt Pettifer (born 1968), known as Julian Barratt, English comedian
- Kayne Pettifer (born 1982), Australian rules footballer
- Steve Pettifer (born 1965), English computer scientist
- Tiggy Legge-Bourke (born 1965), English nanny, now Tiggy Pettifer

== See also ==
- Petford
- Pettifor
- Pettiford
