= The Little Red Book of Acoustics =

The Little Red Book of Acoustics is a small book giving an overview of UK acoustic regulations. The book also gives an introduction to acoustics and acoustic definitions.

This acoustics book is often used by professionals working in areas where some understanding in acoustics is required such as members of the Chartered Institute of Environmental Health and Town Planners.

The book is also useful for students undertaking the Institute of Acoustics Diploma and similar courses. The Little Red Book of Acoustics is one of the most popular books on the subject of acoustics for students and those new to acoustics in the UK.

Additionally the book provides a handy introduction to acoustics for architects, covering for example, Approved Document E and is available on the RIBA bookshop website as well as the main UK bookshops.

The book is written by Richard Watson and Owen Downey and published by Blue Tree Acoustics. The second edition is released in September 2008 and is ISBN 9780956001207.
