= Zhongqing Su =

Chinese engineer

Zhongqing Su (Chinese: 蘇眾慶) is a mechanical engineer. He is the Chair Professor of Intelligent Structures and Systems and Head of the Department of Mechanical Engineering at the Hong Kong Polytechnic University.

Su earned his BEng and MS from the School of Aeronautical Science and Engineering at Beijing University of Aeronautics and Astronautics and PhD from the School of Aerospace, Mechanical and Mechatronic Engineering at University of Sydney. He also holds the Changjiang Chair Professorship

He is the Editor-in-Chief of the academic journal Ultrasonics. He is an elected Distinguished Fellow of the International Institute of Acoustics and Vibration (IIAV) and a fellow of the Hong Kong Institution of Engineers. His research interests span the area of ultrasonics, structural health monitoring (SHM), wave propagation, smart materials, intelligent systems, and advanced composites.
