= Rustum Roy =

Indian born American physicist (1924–2010)

Rustum Roy (July 3, 1924 – August 26, 2010) was a physicist, born in India, who became a professor at Pennsylvania State University and was a leader in materials research. As an advocate for interdisciplinarity, he initiated a movement of materials research societies and, outside of his multiple areas of scientific and engineering expertise, wrote impassioned pleas about the need for a fusion of religion and science and humanistic causes.

Later in life he held visiting professorships in materials science at Arizona State University, and in medicine at the University of Arizona.

== Early life and education ==
Roy was born in Ranchi, Bihar Province, India, the son of Narenda Kumar and Rajkumari Roy.

Rustum took a Cambridge School Certificate from Saint Paul's School Darjeeling. Rustum studied physical chemistry at Patna University, gaining his bachelor's degree in 1942 and master's degree in 1944. The following year he began study at Pennsylvania State University and earned his Ph.D. in engineering ceramics in 1948.

Rustum Roy married fellow materials scientist Della Marie Martin on June 8 that year.

== Career ==
In 1962 he was named the first director of the Materials Research Laboratory at Penn State. He edited the Proceedings of a 1968 Conference on the chemistry of silicon carbide. The next year a national colloquy was held on materials science in the United States for which Roy edited the Proceedings. In 1973 he edited the Proceedings of a conference on phase transitions and their applications.

In 1974 Roy and Olaf Müller published The Major Ternary Structural Families with Springer-Verlag, which described the principal crystal structures of ternary compounds. The book received two brief reviews in materials trade journals. A cement journal reviewer said it would be "Useful to the practicing materials researcher, whether in industry or university, as well as the non-specialist who needs to become informed about particular materials." A chemist writing for mineral processing readers, described its depth:

The structural descriptions are at times too brief but the chapters contain valuable information such as compositional structure field maps (radius A vs. radius B), figures of unit cells or the polyhedral arrangements in some common structures, phase diagrams (P vs. T, or P vs. ionic radius), structural relationships, and phase transition data.

By 1991 he was a spokesperson for the movement and his lecture "New Materials: Fountainhead for New Technologies and New Science" was published by National Academy Press. Roy presented the lecture to learned audiences in Washington, D.C.; Tokyo, Japan; New Delhi, Stockholm, Copenhagen, and London in 1991 and 92. He made the case for linking a technical need to investigative effort, which he terms "technology traction", noting that the method is productive and cost-effective in comparison to science conducted with other purposes.

Rustum Roy was referred to as "[o]ne of the legends of materials science" at the time of his death.

Roy was elected as a member of the U.S. National Academy of Engineering in 1973.

== Other interests ==
=== Academic freedom ===
In 1953, Roy wrote a letter to Life magazine in response to the essay "Is Academic Freedom in Danger?" by Whittaker Chambers, stating:

Sirs:
Chambers neglects to note that since people rarely read Congressional Records, they get their News more by headlines and the tenor of the times. Thus, most professors "know" or "feel" it is safer today to keep your mouth shut, and, if you open it, not to support any liberal or leftish views. Let Chambers continue to remind us of the very real perils of the Communist left. Fanatical preoccupation with self-preservation will lead to loss of more valuable things, not merely academic freedom, but freedom.
Rustum Roy
Assistant Professor
The Pennsylvania State College
State College, PA

=== University reform ===
In 1977 Rustum Roy proposed that the "science and engineering activity of a university ... [be organized] primarily around a dozen permanent mission-oriented interdisciplinary laboratories." To reach this conclusion he notes that "universities have been forced into new interdisciplinary patterns not only by the dollar sign but also by the inexorable logic that the real problems of society do not come in discipline-shaped blocks."

The daunting structural inertia of the university did not faze him:

A human being, that is both a naked ape and a fallen angel, can manage perhaps to organize the university with both the ivory tower and service-station character.

=== Health ===
Roy had no formal medical credentials but was an advocate of integrating science, medicine, and spirituality. In the inaugural issue of the Journal of Ayurveda and Integrative Medicine Roy contributed the article "Integrative medicine to tackle the problem of chronic diseases". He noted that chronic illness debilitates the lives of many seniors, and that medical interventions are often futile. He said "little of nothing is being spent on preventative medicine", and cited the ayurveda concepts of "ahara" concerned with nutrition, and "vihara" with the conduct of life. He noted the exemplary work of Dean Ornish in addressing coronary artery disease as a hopeful innovation.

In 2010, close to the end of his life, Roy co-wrote an article in the Huffington Post called "The Mythology Of Science-Based Medicine" with nonscientists Deepak Chopra and Larry Dossey, which David Gorski characterized as "an exercise that combines cherry-picking, logical fallacies, and whining, raising the last of these almost to an art form."

== Personal life and death ==
Roy married Della Martin Roy on June 8, 1948. Their three children are Neill R. Roy (deceased), Jeremy R. Roy, and Ronnen A. Roy.

Roy died on August 26, 2010, at the age of 86. He was survived by his wife and children.

== Awards and honours ==
- 1973: Member, National Academy of Engineering
- 1979: Hibbert Lecturer

== Patents ==
Selection of U.S. patents for which Roy is the sole or primary inventor:

- U.S. patent 3098699A Densification of glass, germanium oxide, silica or boric acid (July 23, 1963)
- U.S. patent 4430256A Reverse thermodynamic chemical barrier for nuclear waste over-pack or backfill (February 7, 1984)
- U.S. patent 4675302A Low expansion ceramic material (June 23, 1987)
- U.S. patent 4829031A Method of preparing ceramic compositions at lower sintering temperatures (May 9, 1989)
- U.S. patent 6342195B1 Method for synthesizing solids such as diamond and products produced thereby (January 29, 2002)
- U.S. patent 6365885B1 Microwave processing in pure H fields and pure E fields (April 2, 2002)
- U.S. patent 6805835B2 Process for sintering powder metal components (October 19, 2004)
- U.S. patent 7850759B2 Metal extraction from various chalcogenide minerals through interaction with separate electric fields and magnetic fields supplied by electromagnetic energy (December 14, 2010)
- U.S. patent 8110171B1 Method for decolorizing diamonds (February 7, 2012)

== Publications ==
=== Monographs ===
- Muller, Olaf; Roy, Rustum (1974). The major ternary structural families. New York: Springer-Verlag. ISBN 0-387-06430-3. OCLC 1056558.

=== Edited volumes ===
- Materials Science and Engineering in the United States: Proceedings (1970, contributor), Pennsylvania State University Press, ISBN 0271001011.
- Materials Science and Engineering Serving Society (1998, with others), Elsevier Science, ISBN 0444827935.
- The Interdisciplinary Imperative: Interactive Research and Education, Still an Elusive Goal in Academia (2000), Writers Club Press, ISBN 0595011799.

=== Other authored/co-authored books ===
- Honest Sex (2003 [1969], with coauthor Della Roy), Signet Press, ISBN 0595272134.
- Experimenting With Truth: The Fusion of Religion With Technology Needed for Humanity's Survival [1979 Hibbert Lectures] (1980), Pergamon Press, ISBN 0080258204.
- Radioactive Waste (1982), Pergamon Press, ISBN 0080275419.
- Lost at the Frontier: U.S. Science and Technology Policy Adrift (1985), ISI Press, ISBN 0894950428.

=== Other works ===
- Science of Whole Person Healing: Proceedings of the First Interdisciplinary International Conference (2003, contributor), iUniverse, ISBN 0595301533.
- Observations and Studies of the Healing Efficacy of the Life Vessel (2012) [2009].

== See also ==
- Structure field map
