= David Pettifor =

British metallurgist (1945–2017)

David Godfrey Pettifor CBE FRS
- Professor D. G. Pettifor
- Born: 9 March 1945; Keighley, England, UK
- Died: 16 October 2017 (aged 72)
- Education: University of Witwatersrand; University of Cambridge
- Known for: Structure maps Computational materials science
- Scientific career
- Fields: Metallurgy
- Workplaces: University of Oxford
- Thesis: Electron theory of transition metals
- Doctoral advisor: Volker Heine

David Godfrey Pettifor CBE FRS (9 March 1945 – 16 October 2017) was the Isaac Wolfson Professor of Metallurgy at the University of Oxford from 1992 to 2011. He was also a Fellow of St Edmund Hall, Oxford.

He was the author of a book entitled Bonding and Structure of Molecules and Solids (Oxford University Press). He created "structure maps" which determine which crystal structure an alloy will form. He was a world authority on materials modelling and helped established the Oxford Materials Modelling Laboratory.

He held a BSc from the University of Witwatersrand in South Africa and a PhD from the University of Cambridge, supervised by Volker Heine.

He was made a CBE in the Queen's Birthday Honours in 2005. In 1999, he received the Royal Society Armourers and Brasiers' Medal. Other awards include the William Hume-Rothery Award and the Hume-Rothery Prize.

He died on 16 October 2017.

== Bibliography ==
- Pettifor, D. G. (1985). The Recursion Method and Its Applications : Proceedings of the Conference, Imperial College, London, England September 13-14, 1984. D. L. Weaire. Berlin, Heidelberg: Springer Berlin Heidelberg. ISBN 978-3-642-82444-9. OCLC 840301154.
- Electron theory in alloy design. D. G. Pettifor, Alan Cottrell, Institute of Materials. London: Institute of Materials. 1992. ISBN 978-1-907625-59-6. OCLC 699513619.
- Pettifor, D. G. (1995). Bonding and structure of molecules and solids. Oxford: Clarendon Press. ISBN 0-19-851787-4. OCLC 32779944.
