= Pettiford =

Pettiford is an English surname. The name comes from the Old French nickname "pied de fer", meaning "Iron Foot".

People with this name include:

- Jack Pettiford (1919–1964), Australian cricketer
- Kenneth Pettiford (born 1950), American college football player and coach
- Keith Pettiford (1915–1942), Australian rugby football player
- Oscar Pettiford (1922–1960), American jazz double bassist, cellist and composer
- Valarie Pettiford (born 1960), American stage and television actress, dancer, and jazz singer
- William R. Pettiford (1847–1914), American banker

== See also ==
- Pettifer
- Pettifor
