= IEEE Transactions on Ultrasonics, Ferroelectrics, and Frequency Control =

- Discipline: Ultrasonics, acoustics, ferroelectrics and piezoelectrics, frequency control
- Language: English
- Edited by: Alfred C. H. Yu

Publication details
- Former names: Transactions of the IRE Professional Group on Ultrasonic Engineering (1954); IRE Transactions on Ultrasonic Engineering (1955-1962); IEEE Transactions on Ultrasonics Engineering (1963); IEEE Transactions on Sonics and Ultrasonics (1964-1985)
- History: 1954-present
- Publisher: IEEE
- Frequency: Monthly
- Impact factor: 4 (2025)

Standard abbreviations
- ISO 4: IEEE Trans. Ultrason. Ferroelectr. Freq. Control

Indexing
- ISSN: 0885-3010 (print); 1525-8955 (web)
- LCCN: 86640938
- OCLC no.: 1367312554

Links
- Journal homepage; Online access; Online archive

IEEE Transactions on Ultrasonics, Ferroelectrics, and Frequency Control is a monthly peer-reviewed scientific journal published by the IEEE Ultrasonics, Ferroelectrics, and Frequency Control Society. It was founded in 1954 under the name Transactions of the IRE Professional Group on Ultrasonic Engineering. The journal covers the fundamental research and technical advances in ultrasonics, ferroelectrics, piezoelectrics and frequency control. Its editor-in-chief is Alfred C. H. Yu (University of Toronto).

According to the Journal Citation Reports, the journal has a 2025 impact factor of 4.
