= Journal of Sound and Vibration =

- Discipline: Acoustics
- Language: English
- Edited by: A. V. Metrikine

Publication details
- History: 1964–present
- Publisher: Elsevier
- Frequency: Biweekly
- Impact factor: 4.9 (2024)

Standard abbreviations
- ISO 4: J. Sound Vib.

Indexing
- ISSN: 0022-460X

Links
- Journal homepage

The Journal of Sound and Vibration is a scientific journal in the field of acoustics. It is published biweekly by Elsevier. The journal is devoted to the prompt publication of original papers, both theoretical and experimental, that provide new information on any aspect of sound or vibration. Its editor-in-chief is A. V. Metrikine (Delft University of Technology).

== Abstracting and indexing ==
The journal is abstracted and indexed in:

- Current Contents/Engineering, Computing & Technology
- EBSCO databases
- Ei Compendex
- Inspec
- Science Citation Index Expanded
- Scopus
- zbMATH Open

According to the Journal Citation Reports, the journal has a 2024 impact factor of 4.9.
