= Susan Trolier-McKinstry =

American materials scientist

- Scientific career
- Institutions: Pennsylvania State University
- Thesis: Use of photolithography and chemical etching in the preparation of miniature piezoelectric devices from lead zirconate titanate (PZT) ceramics (1987)

Susan Trolier-McKinstry is an American materials scientist. She is the Steward S. Flaschen Professor of Materials Science and Engineering and Electrical Engineering at Pennsylvania State University, Director of the W. M. Keck Smart Materials Integration Laboratory, and co-director of the Nanofabrication facility.

== Education ==
Troiler-McKinstry obtained her Bachelor of Science in Ceramic Science and Engineering from Penn State University. She went on to earn her PhD in Ceramic Science at Penn State University in 1992 while working with Professor Robert E. Newnham.

== Research and professional activities ==
Trolier-McKinstry carries out research in the area of electroceramics, including work on dielectric and piezoelectric thin films. Her research has applications in CMOS electronics and MEMS devices. She has developed materials applicable in tunable filters, sensors, and actuators, among other technological applications.

Troiler-McKinstry became a fellow of IEEE in 2009 after serving as the President of the IEEE Ultrasonics, Ferroelectrics, and Frequency Control Society from 2008–2009. She is also a fellow of the American Ceramic Society and an academician of the World Academy of Ceramics. Additional service includes a term as President of the Ceramics Education Council and serving on the Board of Directors for the Materials Research Society as Vice President in 2016 and President in 2017. In 2019, she was elected to the National Academy of Engineering. She has served as an associate editor for multiple journals including IEEE Transactions on Ultrasonics, Ferroelectrics, and Frequency Control, the Journal of the American Ceramic Society, and Applied Physics Letters.

== Selected awards ==
- National Security Science and Engineering Faculty Fellowship
- IEEE Ferroelectrics Achievement Award
- 2015-2016 IEEE Ultrasonics, Ferroelectrics, and Frequency Control Society Distinguished Lecturer
- Ceramics Education Council Outstanding Educator Award
- American Ceramic Society Robert L. Coble Award for Young Scholars (2000)
- Outstanding Educator Award, Ceramic Educational Council
