= Ahmed Busnaina =

American engineer

Ahmed A. Busnaina is an American nanotechnologist who is the William Lincoln Smith Chair and University Distinguished Professor, and Director of National Science Foundation’s Nanoscale Science and Engineering Center (NSEC) for High-rate Nanomanufacturing and of the NSF Center for Microcontamination Control at Northeastern University in Boston, Massachusetts.

Busnaina is recognized for his work on nano and micro scale defects mitigation and removal in semiconductor fabrication. He specializes in directed assembly of nanoelements and in the nanomanufacturing of micro and nanoscale devices. Professor Busnaina authored the book Nanomanufacturing Handbook, published in 2006. He authored more than 500 publications in journals, proceedings and conferences.

He an associate editor of the Microelectronic Engineering Journal, and an associate editor of the Journal of Nanoparticle Research. He also serves/served on many advisory boards including Samsung Electronics; Chemical Industry Nanomaterials Roadmap, the

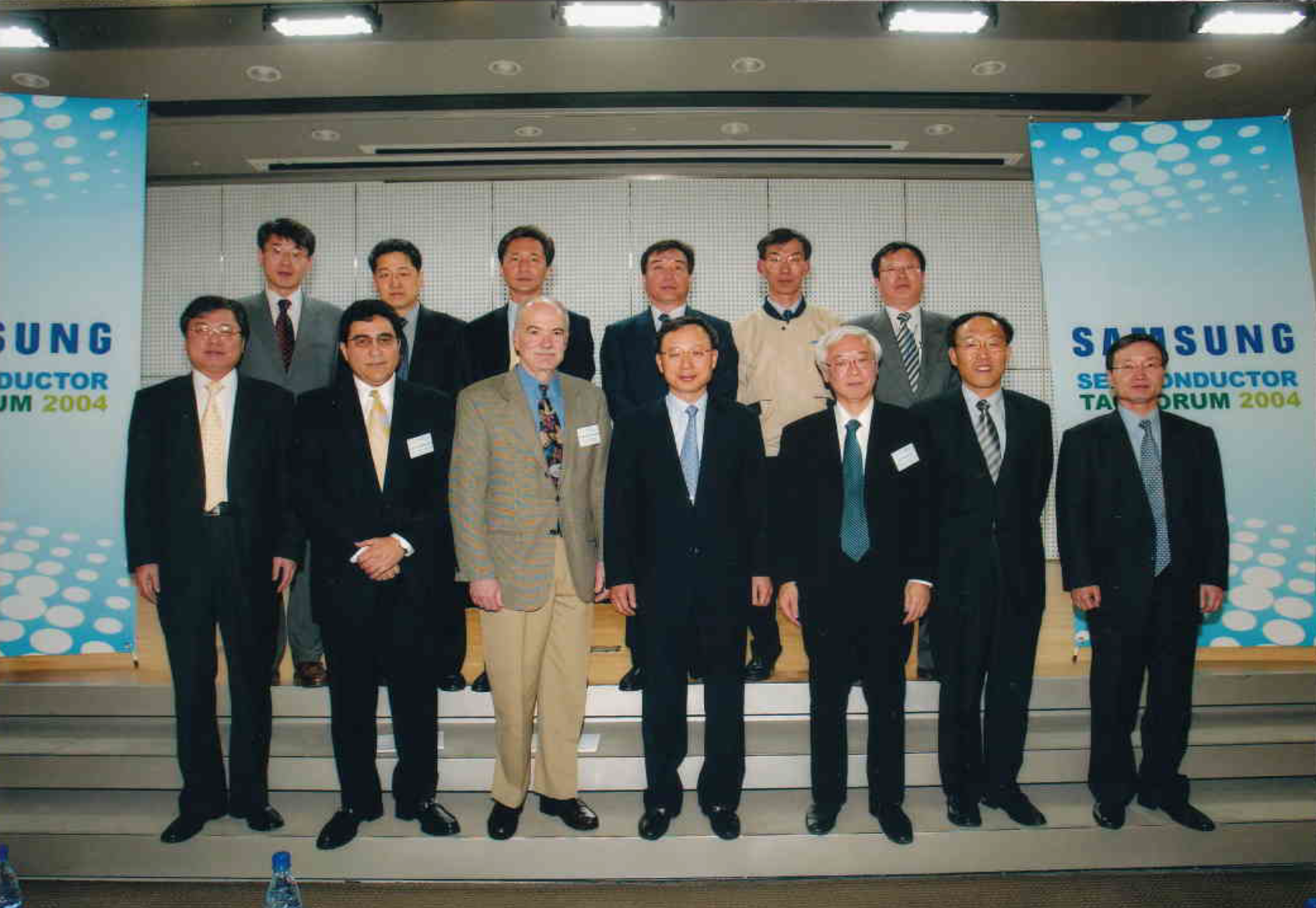
Members of the Samsung Electronics Technical Advisory Board with Dr. Hwang (in the center, front row), Samsung Electronics President & CEO. Busnaina is in the front row second from the left. 2004

International Technology Roadmap for Semiconductors, Journal of Particulate Science and Technology, Journal of Environmental Sciences Journal of the IEST, Journal of Advanced Applications in Contamination Control.

He is a fellow of National Academy of Inventors (NAI), a fellow of American Society of Mechanical Engineers, and the Adhesion Society. He is a Fulbright Senior Scholar and listed in Marquis Who's Who in the World, ISBN 978-0-8379-1145-8, Who's Who in America, ISBN 978-0-8379-0283-8, Who's Who in science and engineering, ISBN 978-0-8379-5770-8, etc.). He is the 2020 ASME William T. Ennor Manufacturing Technology Award and Medal recipient, 2006 Nanotech Briefs National Nano50 Award recipient, Innovator category, the SØren Buus Outstanding Research Award, Northeastern University 2006, the 2005 Aspiration Award, Northeastern University.
