= Beatmapping =

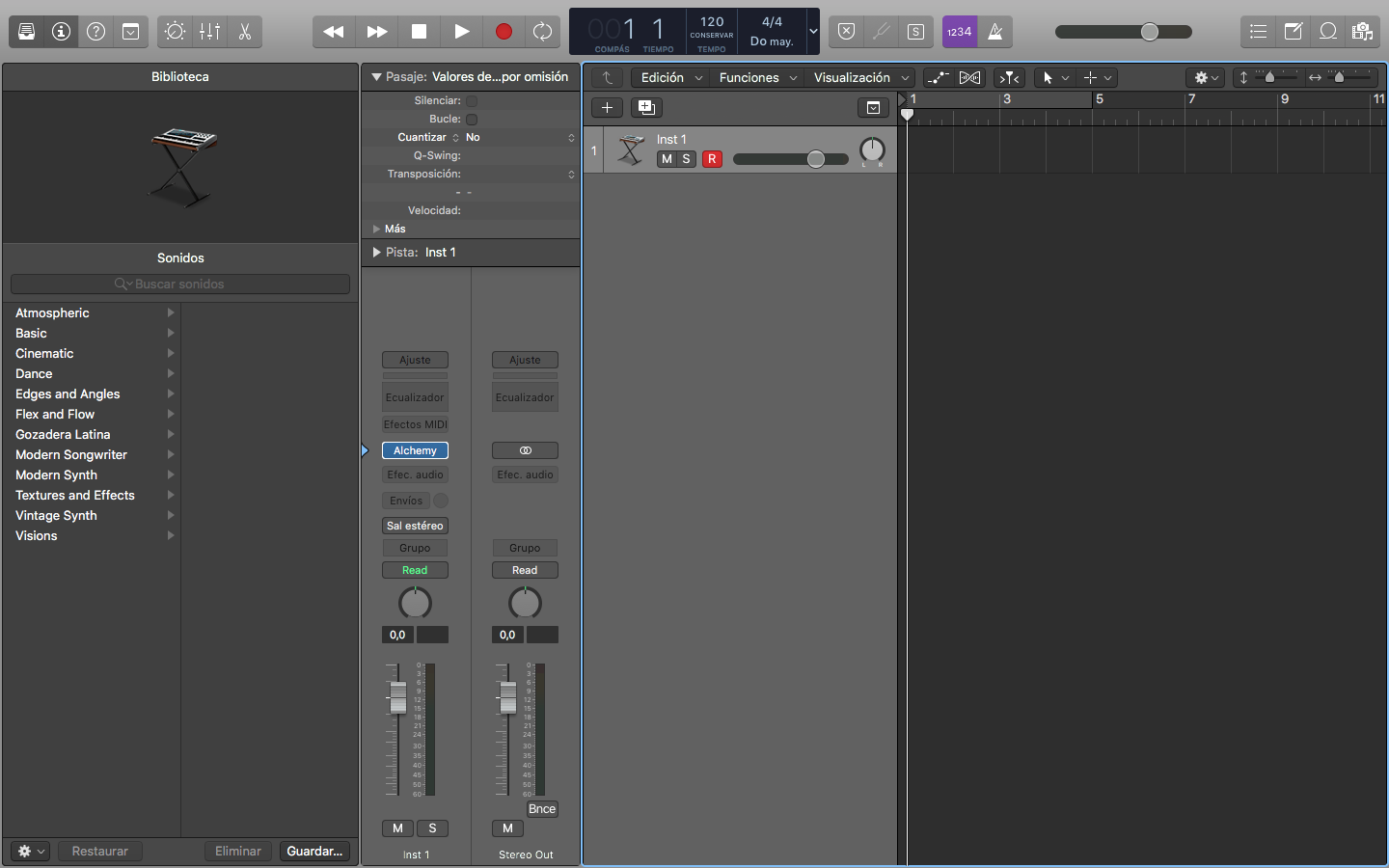
Interface of Logic Pro, a software with built-in Beatmapping.

Beatmapping is the detection of a beat or tempo in music using software. Beatmapping visually lays out/displays the tempo (speed) of music throughout the entirety or portion of a song or music piece. This "mapping" is done with software specifically designed for beatmapping.

Beatmapping software is often a component of music editing and mixing software like Apple's Logic Pro 9 or Sony's Acid Music Studio. A benefit of beatmapping when mixing music is that it keeps the project in time with the metronome tempo which is the steady underlying base beat of the music. Beatmapping software is also often used to help develop a beat to use underlying with a live music performance and "objects" are added to the map of beats that set a change in tempo matching changes in music during the live performance. Beatmapping software usually requires some measure of input from the user, including the tempo, track or instrument that keeps time, information it can then use to analyse the audio and produce an estimated "tick", and even stretch or squash tracks wandering off-beat to fit the correct tempo. Typically, this is done by finding "transients" - short peaks in the audio waveform at regular intervals, with said intervals being sometimes affected by the requisite note values, as indicated by the user before the analysis takes place.

Beatmapping is also software built-in to rhythm games, to mitigate for imperfect human rhythm, and is designed in such a way that notes played off-beat in a way indistinguishable to the human ear (albeit distinguishable for computers) qualify as "correct". Different forms of analysis can be used for procedurally generated beatmaps for a given level, and recent approaches have employed machine learning for this beatmap generation, in order to make on-the-fly estimates for player accuracy.

== Functionality ==
=== Beat identification ===
Some software takes parameters to beatmap automatically, and allows the user to finesse the delineations the software makes. Pro Tools plugin Beat Detective identifies "transients" (high-pitched beats) to determine where beats are, based on a tempo given by the user. This can be done by a fairly simple algorithm, just detecting spikes in the audio waveform, or a more complex approach (sometimes using machine learning), where a more sophisticated analysis of the audio takes place, such as analysis of instruments.

=== Quantising beats ===
Beatmapping software will also often involve a tool that uses the identified transients to quantise the audio, meaning snapping it to the beat. This normalises audio tracks by moving transients to the closest beat to them.

== Examples ==
=== DAWs ===
Apple's Logic Pro, contains an "Analyse Transients" feature, which identifies the beats in a selected audio clip. The user can change its sensitivity by increasing or decreasing the number of transients the software is detecting, and using the tool with more transients will be more likely to detect more subtle accents, but can also lead to incorrect detection of beats.

Pro Tools has a plugin called "Beat Detective", that has a similar function, wherein it marks the beat by identifying transients. It also has a feature that allows the user to quantise the transients to the nearest user-selected beat. It struggles with tracks that contain multiple drum parts, and sometimes requires heavy user input.

=== Other uses ===
In rhythm games, such as Osu!, beatmaps are built in to the games, to provide the user with a pre-packaged beatmap that their inputs will be held to the standard of - with additional leniency, to account for human error. Osu! has a beatmap editor, for users to input the timings of new levels for the game.

== See also ==
- Quantization (music)
