= Nazanin Bassiri-Gharb =

Mechanical engineer

- Education: Università degli Studi di Padova; Penn State University
- Scientific career
- Fields: Micro and Nano Engineering
- Workplaces: Georgia Institute of Technology; SMART Lab
- Doctoral advisor: Susan Trolier-McKinstry

Nazanin Bassiri-Gharb is a mechanical engineer in the field of micro and nano engineering and mechanics of materials. She is the Harris Saunders Jr. Chair and Professor in the George W. Woodruff School of Mechanical Engineering at the Georgia Institute of Technology in Atlanta, Georgia. Bassiri-Gharb leads the Smart Materials, Advanced Research and Technology (SMART) Laboratory at Georgia Tech. Her research seeks to characterize and optimize the optical and electric response of interferometric modulator (IMOD) displays. She also investigates novel materials to improve reliability and processing of IMOD.

== Education ==
Bassiri-Gharb obtained her Laurea Degree from the University of Padua in Italy in 2001. She graduated with a Doctorate of Philosophy in Materials Science and Engineering from Pennsylvania State University in 2005. Her thesis was entitled Dielectric and Piezoelectric Nonlinearities in Oriented Pb(Yb1/2Nb1/2)03-PbTiO3 Thin Films.

== Career ==
=== Research interests ===
Bassiri-Gharb is interested in applying ferroelectric and multiferroic materials to micro- and nano- electromechanical systems. She is also interested in using these materials to develop novel sensors and actuators for the fields of environmental energy harvesting, tunable photonic crystals, and ultrasonic transducers. Additionally, Bassiri-Gharb researches peizoelectric MEMS devices to manipulate nanoscale materials.

=== Professional societies ===
- Institute of Electrical and Electronics Engineers - Ultrasonics, Ferroelectrics, and Frequency Control Society (IEEE UFFC-S)
- Institute of Electrical and Electronics Engineers (IEEE)- Women in Engineering
- Society of Women Engineers

=== Professional committees ===
Bassiri-Gharb has sat and sits on several professional committees.

- Scientific Reports, Editorial Board: 2014–present
- IEEE UFFC-S, President: 2018-2019
- IEEE UFFC-S, President-Elect: 2016-2017
- IEEE UFFC-S, Newsletter Editor-in-Chief: 2012-2013
- IEEE Transactions on Ultrasonics, Ferroelectrics and Frequency Control, Associate Editor: 2011–present
- IEEE Nanotechnology Council, AdCom Representative: 2008-2013
- IEEE Women in Engineering, Society Liaison: 2008-2013
- IEEE Educational Committee Officer: 2006–present
- Journal of Electroceramics, Editorial Board, 2007–present

== Awards and patents ==
=== Awards ===
- IEEE-Ultrasonics, Ferroelectrics and Frequency Control (UFFC) Ferroelectrics Young Investigator Award, 2013
- NSF Career Award, 2013
- Georgia Institute of Technology, Class of 1969 Teaching Fellow, 2012
- Bennett Aerospace, Researcher of the year award, 2011

=== Patents ===
- Soft Template Manufacturing of Nanomaterials, U.S. Patent 20130149500A1 with A. Bernal, 2011
