= Structure field map =

Visualizations in crystallography

Structure field maps (SFMs) or structure maps are visualizations of the relationship between ionic radii and crystal structures for representing classes of materials. The SFM and its extensions has found broad applications in geochemistry, mineralogy, chemical synthesis of materials, and nowadays in materials informatics.

== History ==
The intuitive concept of the SFMs led to different versions of the visualization method established in different domains of materials science.

Structure field map was first introduced in 1954 by MacKenzie L. Keith and Rustum Roy to classify structural prototypes for the oxide perovskites of the chemical formula ABO_{3}. It was later popularized by a compiled handbook written by Olaf Muller and Rustum Roy, published in 1974 that included many more known materials.

== Examples ==
A structure field map is typically two-dimensional, although higher dimensional versions are feasible. The axes in an SFM are the ionic sequences. For example, in oxide perovskites ABO_{3}, where A and B represent two metallic cations, the two axes are ionic radii of the A-site and B-site cations. SFMs are constructed according to the oxidation states of the constituent cations. For perovskites of the type ABO_{3}, three ways of cation pairings exist: A^{3+}B^{3+}O_{3}, A^{2+}B^{4+}O_{3}, and A^{1+}B^{5+}O_{3}, therefore, three different SFMs exist for each pairs of cation oxidation states.

== See also ==
- Goldschmidt tolerance factor
- Ramachandran plot
