= Nazanin Aghakhani =

- Born: 22 April 1980 (age 44); Vienna, Austria
- Occupation: orchestral conductor

Nazanin Aghakhani (Persian: نازنین آقاخانی, also Romanized as “Nāzanīn Āghākhānī”; born 22 April 1980 in Vienna, Austria) is an orchestral conductor.

== Life ==
Born to a family of Iranian ancestry, Aghakhani took piano lessons since the age of eight. From the age of twelve, she studied the classical piano at the Vienna Conservatory with Karl Barth, later with Meira Farkas. At the same age, she started studies on harmony, counterpoint and conducting with Thomas Christian David and continued these studies as a young adult first at the University of Music and Performing Arts in Vienna with Erwin Acel and Leopold Hager, then at Kungliga Musikhögskolan in Stockholm with Jorma Panula. In Stockholm, Nazanin Aghakhani studied also electro-acoustic composition, instructed by Bill Brunson and Fredrik Hedelin. In 2008 Aghakhani finished her Master of Arts degree with distinction at the Sibelius Academy, where she studied orchestral and operatic conducting with Leif Segerstam.

She has tutored Swedish youth orchestras and performed her own compositions throughout Europe. She made her début as a conductor at the Musica Nova Festival in 2007, an annual contemporary music event in Helsinki where she was invited again in 2008 and 2009.

In 2008, Aghakhani premiered compositions by young European composers at Wien Modern, the Vienna Festival for contemporary music, was a member of the jury at the Ung Nordisk Musik Festival for young Scandinavian composers and acted as assistant conductor for Mozart's Don Giovanni at the Salzburg Festival in Austria.

In 2010, Aghakhani became the first female conductor in history to perform in Iran, conducting the Tehran Symphony Orchestra.

From 2010 until 2012, she was the first woman to be the chief conductor of the Akademisches Sinfonie Orchester München, Germany.

Besides conducting and writing, Aghakhani has recorded several albums as a solo pianist with her own compositions in improvisational form, mainly recorded on Bösendorfer pianos.
