= Applied Acoustics =

- Language: English
- Edited by: S. K. Tang

Publication details
- History: 1968–present
- Publisher: Elsevier (England)
- Frequency: Bimonthly
- Open access: Partial
- Impact factor: 3.4 (2022)

Standard abbreviations
- ISO 4: Appl. Acoust.

Indexing
- CODEN: AACOBL
- ISSN: 0003-682X (print); 1872-910X (web)
- LCCN: 78000217
- OCLC no.: 01481719

Links
- Journal homepage; Online access

Applied Acoustics (French: Acoustique Appliquée, German: Angewandte Akustik) is a bimonthly peer-reviewed scientific journal. It was established in 1968 by Elsevier, which continues to publish the journal bimonthly. This journal covers research and applications in all aspects of acoustics. The editor in chief is Shiu Keung Tang (University of Hull).

According to the Journal Citation Reports, the journal has a 2025 impact factor of 3.4.

== Abstracting and indexing ==
This journal is indexed by the following services:

- Science Citation Index
- Current Contents/ Engineering, Computing & Technology
- Academic Onefile
- Applied Mechanics Reviews
- CSA (database company)
- Ei Compendex
- EBSCO Information Services
- GeoRef
- INSPEC
- Scopus
