= Ultrasonics (journal) =

- Discipline: Ultrasound research, development, and technology
- Language: English
- Edited by: Zhongqing Su

Publication details
- History: 1963–present
- Publisher: Elsevier
- Frequency: Bimonthly
- Impact factor: 4.8 (2025)

Standard abbreviations
- ISO 4: Ultrasonics

Indexing
- CODEN: ULTRA3
- ISSN: 0041-624X
- LCCN: sf80000765
- OCLC no.: 1607881

Links
- Journal homepage; Online access

Ultrasonics is a bimonthly peer-reviewed scientific journal published by Elsevier and covering research on theory and application of ultrasonics in physics, biology, chemistry, medicine, underwater acoustics, industry, materials characterization, control, and other disciplines. The journal was established in 1963 and the editor-in-chief is Prof. Zhongqing Su (The Hong Kong Polytechnic University).

== Abstracting and indexing ==
The journal is abstracted and indexed in:

- Science Citation Index
- Current Contents/ Engineering, Computing and Technology
- Applied Science & Technology Index
- Chemical Abstracts
- Computer & Control Abstracts
- Electrical & Electronics Abstracts
- Engineering Index
- Excerpta Medica
- FLUIDEX
- GeoRef
- Index Medicus/MEDLINE/PubMed
- Metals Abstracts
- Physics and Science Abstracts. Section A
- World Aluminum Abstracts

According to the Journal Citation Reports, the journal has a 2025 impact factor of 4.8.
