= Seismic migration =

Measurement process

Seismic migration is the process by which seismic events are geometrically re-located in either space or time to the location the event occurred in the subsurface rather than the location that it was recorded at the surface, thereby creating a more accurate image of the subsurface. This process is necessary to overcome the limitations of geophysical methods imposed by areas of complex geology, such as: faults, salt bodies, folding, etc.

Migration moves dipping reflectors to their true subsurface positions and collapses diffractions, resulting in a migrated image that typically has an increased spatial resolution and resolves areas of complex geology much better than non-migrated images. A form of migration is one of the standard data processing techniques for reflection-based geophysical methods (seismic reflection and ground-penetrating radar)

The need for migration has been understood since the beginnings of seismic exploration and the very first seismic reflection data from 1921 were migrated. Computational migration algorithms have been around for many years but they have only entered wide usage in the past 20 years because they are extremely resource-intensive. Migration can lead to a dramatic uplift in image quality so algorithms are the subject of intense research, both within the geophysical industry as well as academic circles.

== Rationale ==
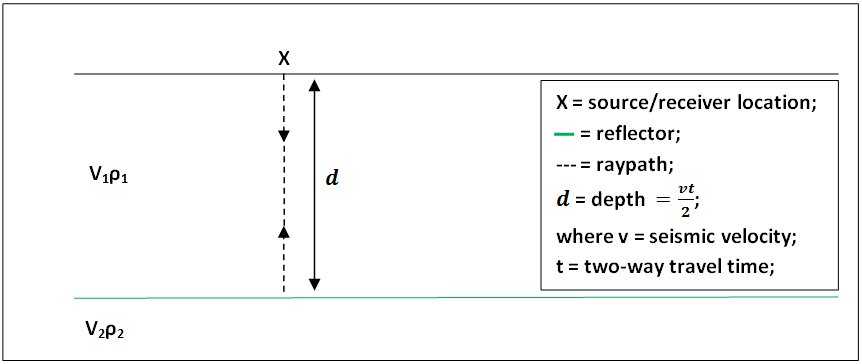
Diagram showing the raypath for a zero-offset reflection from a horizontal reflector.

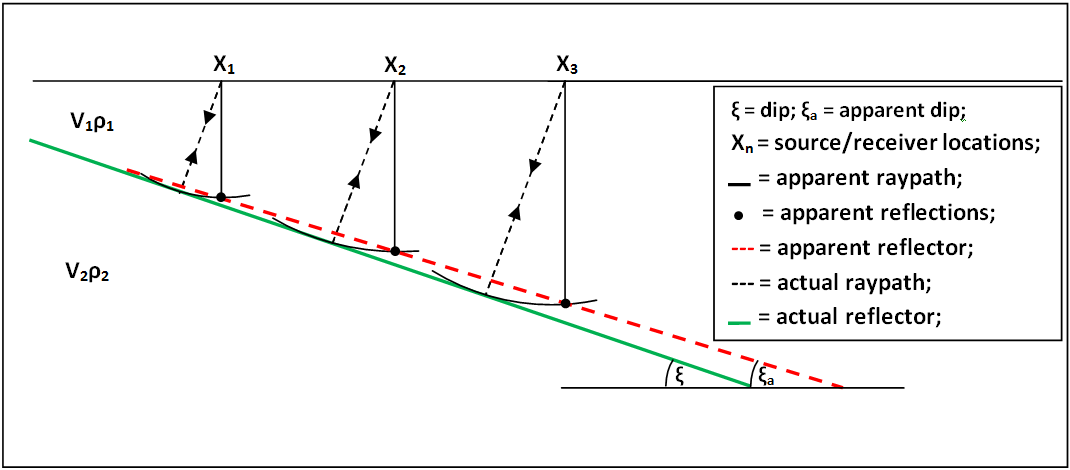
Diagram showing the raypath for a zero-offset reflection from a dipping reflector and the resultant apparent dip.

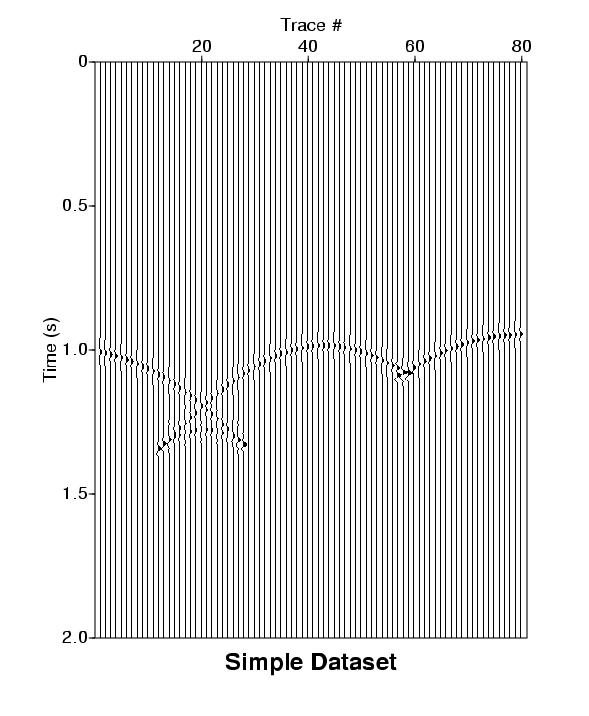
A zero-offset non-migrated data set. Raw zero-offset data for a simple syncline in a constant velocity world. Notice the signature bow-tie effect in the image. This is the result of reflections occurring from both sides of the syncline, and arriving at the same receiver at different times. Migration can correct this effect.

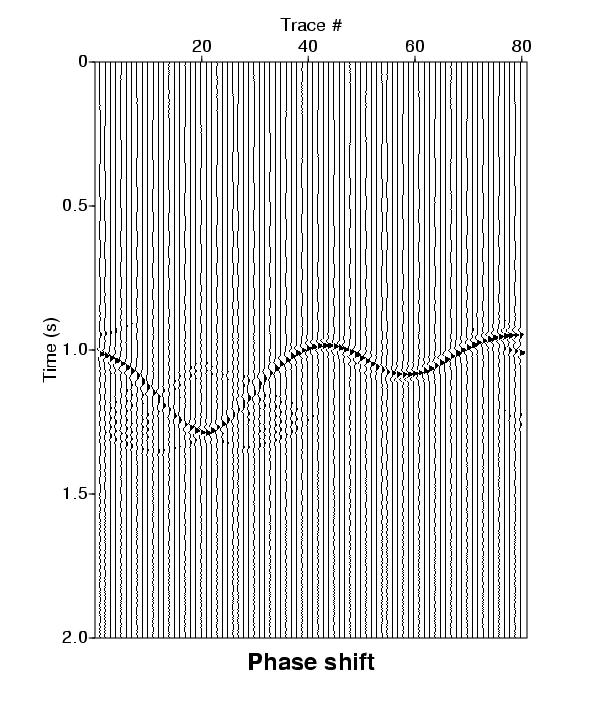
A zero-offset migrated data set of the File:SimpleSyncline.jpg data. This data was migrated using a time-migration referred to as phase-shift which operates in the Fourier domain. The migration has replaced all events in their correct locations, successfully reconstructing a syncline. However, there are erroneous events (swinging arcs) throughout the image which are migration induced noise.

Seismic waves are elastic waves that propagate through the Earth with a finite velocity, governed by the elastic properties of the rock in which they are travelling. At an interface between two rock types, with different acoustic impedances, the seismic energy is either refracted, reflected back towards the surface or attenuated by the medium. The reflected energy arrives at the surface and is recorded by geophones that are placed at a known distance away from the source of the waves. When a geophysicist views the recorded energy from the geophone, they know both the travel time and the distance between the source and the receiver, but not the distance down to the reflector.

In the simplest geological setting, with a single horizontal reflector, a constant velocity and a source and receiver at the same location (referred to as zero-offset, where offset is the distance between the source and receiver), the geophysicist can determine the location of the reflection event by using the relationship:

$$d=\frac{v t}{2},$$

where d is the distance, v is the seismic velocity (or rate of travel) and t is the measured time from the source to the receiver.

In this case, the distance is halved because it can be assumed that it only took one-half of the total travel time to reach the reflector from the source, then the other half to return to the receiver.

The result gives us a single scalar value, which actually represents a half-sphere of distances, from the source/receiver, which the reflection could have originated from. It is a half-sphere, and not a full sphere, because we can ignore all possibilities that occur above the surface as unreasonable. In the simple case of a horizontal reflector, it can be assumed that the reflection is located vertically below the source/receiver point (see diagram).

The situation is more complex in the case of a dipping reflector, as the first reflection originates from further up the direction of dip (see diagram) and therefore the travel-time plot will show a reduced dip that is defined the “migrator’s equation” :

$$\tan \xi_a = \sin \xi,$$

where ξ_{a} is the apparent dip and ξ is the true dip.

Zero-offset data is important to a geophysicist because the migration operation is much simpler, and can be represented by spherical surfaces. When data is acquired at non-zero offsets, the sphere becomes an ellipsoid and is much more complex to represent (both geometrically, as well as computationally).

== Use ==
For a geophysicist, complex geology is defined as anywhere there is an abrupt or sharp contrast in lateral and/or vertical velocity (e.g. a sudden change in rock type or lithology which causes a sharp change in seismic wave velocity).

Some examples of what a geophysicist considers complex geology are: faulting, folding, (some) fracturing, salt bodies, and unconformities. In these situations a form of migration is used called pre-stack migration (PreSM), in which all traces are migrated before being moved to zero-offset. Consequently, much more information is used, which results in a much better image, along with the fact that PreSM honours velocity changes more accurately than post-stack migration.

== Types of migration ==
Depending on budget, time restrictions and the subsurface geology, geophysicists can employ 1 of 2 fundamental types of migration algorithms, defined by the domain in which they are applied: time migration and depth migration.

=== Time migration ===
Time migration is applied to seismic data in time coordinates. This type of migration makes the assumption of only mild lateral velocity variations and this breaks down in the presence of most interesting and complex subsurface structures, particularly salt. Some popularly used time migration algorithms are: Stolt migration, Gazdag and Finite-difference migration.

=== Depth migration ===
Depth Migration is applied to seismic data in depth (regular Cartesian) coordinates, which must be calculated from seismic data in time coordinates. This method does therefore require a velocity model, making it resource-intensive because building a seismic velocity model is a long and iterative process. The significant advantage to this migration method is that it can be successfully used in areas with lateral velocity variations, which tend to be the areas that are most interesting to petroleum geologists. Some of the popularly used depth migration algorithms are Kirchhoff depth migration, Reverse Time Migration (RTM), Gaussian Beam Migration and Wave-equation migration.

== Resolution ==
The goal of migration is to ultimately increase spatial resolution and one of the basic assumptions made about the seismic data is that it only shows primary reflections and all noise has been removed. In order to ensure maximum resolution (and therefore maximum uplift in image quality) the data should be sufficiently pre-processed before migration. Noise that may be easy to distinguish pre-migration could be smeared across the entire aperture length during migration, reducing image sharpness and clarity.

A further basic consideration is whether to use 2D or 3D migration. If the seismic data has an element of cross-dip (a layer that dips perpendicular to the line of acquisition) then the primary reflection will originate from out-of-plane and 2D migration cannot put the energy back to its origin. In this case, 3D migration is needed to attain the best possible image.

Modern seismic processing computers are more capable of performing 3D migration, so the question of whether to allocate resources to performing 3D migration is less of a concern.

== Graphical migration ==
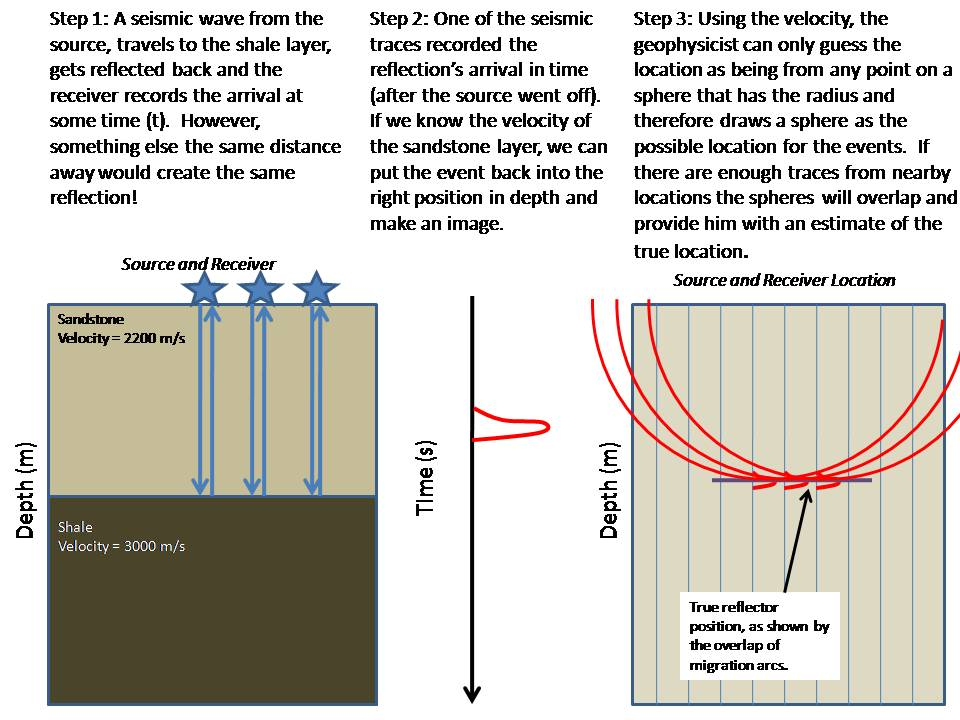
An example of simple graphical migration. Until the advent of modern computers in the 1960s and 1970s this was a method used by geophysicists to primitively 'migrate' their data. This method is obsolete with the advent of digital processors, but is useful for understanding the basic principle behind migration.

The simplest form of migration is that of graphical migration. Graphical migration assumes a constant velocity world and zero-offset data, in which a geophysicist draws spheres or circles from the receiver to the event location for all events. The intersection of the circles then form the reflector's "true" location in time or space. An example of such can be seen in the diagram.

== Technical details ==
Migration of seismic data is the correction of the flat-geological-layer assumption by a numerical, grid-based spatial convolution of the seismic data to account for dipping events (where geological layers are not flat). There are many approaches, such as the popular Kirchhoff migration, but it is generally accepted that processing large spatial sections (apertures) of the data at a time introduces fewer errors, and that depth migration is far superior to time migration with large dips and with complex salt bodies.

Basically, it repositions/moves the energy (seismic data) from the recorded locations to the locations with the correct common midpoint (CMP). While the seismic data is received at the proper locations originally (according to the laws of nature), these locations do not correspond with the assumed CMP for that location. Though stacking the data without the migration corrections yields a somewhat inaccurate picture of the subsurface, migration is preferred for better most imaging recorder to drill and maintain oilfields. This process is a central step in the creation of an image of the subsurface from active source seismic data collected at the surface, seabed, boreholes, etc., and therefore is used on industrial scales by oil and gas companies and their service providers on digital computers.

Explained in another way, this process attempts to account for wave dispersion from dipping reflectors and also for the spatial and directional seismic wave speed (heterogeneity) variations, which cause wavefields (modelled by ray paths) to bend, wave fronts to cross (caustics), and waves to be recorded at positions different from those that would be expected under straight ray or other simplifying assumptions. Finally, this process often attempts to also preserve and extract the formation interface reflectivity information imbedded in the seismic data amplitudes, so that they can be used to reconstruct the elastic properties of the geological formations (amplitude preservation, seismic inversion). There are a variety of migration algorithms, which can be classified by their output domain into the broad categories of time migration or depth migration, and pre-stack migration or post-stack migration (orthogonal) techniques. Depth migration begins with time data converted to depth data by a spatial geological velocity profile. Post-stack migration begins with seismic data which has already been stacked, and thus already lost valuable velocity analysis information.

== See also ==
- Reflection seismology
- Seismic Unix, open source software for processing of seismic reflection data
