= Petrel (reservoir software) =

Software for exploration of petroleum and gas reserves

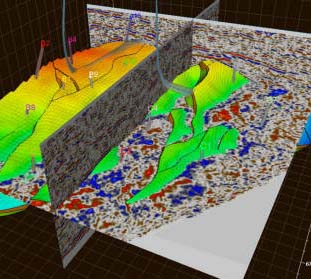
- Developer: Schlumberger
- Stable release: 2015 / June 26, 2015; 11 years ago
- Operating system: Microsoft Windows
- Type: Seismic to simulation
- License: Proprietary
- Website: slb.com/petrel

Petrel is a software platform by Schlumberger Information Solutions used in the exploration and production sector of the petroleum industry. It is a cloud-based platform designed to develop collaborative workflows to increase oil and gas performance. It uses Esri's projection engine for CRS management and is compatible with ArcGIS files. Functionality within Petrel includes: interpreting seismic data, performing well correlation, building reservoir models, visualizing reservoir simulation results, calculating volumes, producing maps, and designing development strategies to maximize reservoir exploitation.

== Background ==
Petrel software was developed in Norway by a company called Technoguide. Technoguide was formed in 1996 by former employees of Geomatic, some of whom were key programmers involved in the early development of RMS. Technoguide made 3D geologic modeling more accessible to all subsurface technical staff, including those without specialist training. Developed for PCs and the Windows OS, Petrel was commercially available in 1998. The Petrel user interface has a pre-arranged workflow to facilitate its use.

In 2002, Schlumberger acquired Technoguide and the Petrel software tools. Schlumberger currently supports and markets Petrel. Newer versions of Petrel include additional functionality such as geological modeling, seismic interpretation, uncertainty analysis, well planning, and links to reservoir simulators.

== Version History ==
Name	Description
Petrel Version 2007.1	The Petrel 2007.1 release expands the application's seismic-to-simulation scope with greater capabilities for exploration workflows. Petrel software now handles larger-scale seismic surveys and regional scale 2D lines. Fracture modeling and dual porosity capabilities support carbonates and unconventional gas workflows. Real-time updates are available through WITSML, the industry standard data delivery mechanism. Petrel 2007.1 software was built on the Ocean framework which allows 3rd parties, universities, oil companies and other parts of Schlumberger to code directly into Petrel.
Petrel Version 2008.1	Released in March 2008. Enhancements include support for hydraulic fractures, sector modeling, multi-threading of several modeling processes, and improvements to the 3D seismic auto tracking workflows. A large re-working of the volume rendering and extraction module now allows users to interactively blend multiple seismic volumes, isolate out areas of interest and then instantly extract what is seen into a 3D object called a geobody. In essence this is “what you see is what you pick”. Extracted 'geobodys' can be sampled directly into the geological model.
Petrel Version 2009.1	Released in February 2009 this is the first version of Petrel to be fully 64 bit and to run on Microsoft's Windows Vista 64 bit OS. This brings large performance benefits to users especially those working in exploration or with large seismic volumes and geological models. Other enhancements include a new type of Seismic Inversion called Genetic Inversion based on a non-linear multi-trace approach. Multipoint Geo statistics, completions modeling, automated fault polygon generation and a new synthetic seismogram package called Seismic-Well-Tie.
Petrel Version 2010.1	Released in May 2010. Enhancements include a new structural modeling workflow enabling the user to build water tight structural models while interpreting. Other enhancements include improvements to the fracture modeling, multipoint Geo statistics, and the volume interpretation workflows. This version also integrates Petromod for petroleum systems modeling and RDR's advanced structural and fault analysis module enabling an integrated approach to exploration to analysis Trap, Seal, Reservoir, & Charge in the same place. Building on the Ocean framework this release coincided with the release of the Ocean Store and online store where users can download plugins for Petrel. You can contribute your plugin to Petrel software.
