= Stacking velocity =

Seismological concept

In reflection seismology, stacking velocity, or Normal Moveout (NMO) velocity, is the value of the seismic velocity obtained from the best fit of the traveltime curve by a hyperbola.. The hyperbolic approximation to the traveltime curve (two-way travel time versus offset) is known as Normal moveout (NMO). The procedure of finding the best fit on common midpoint (CMP) seismic gathers is known as NMO velocity analysis.
