= Stanford Earth imaging Project =

Reflection seismology consortium (1973-)

The Stanford Exploration Project (SEP) is an industry-funded academic consortium within the Geophysics Department at Stanford University. SEP research has contributed greatly to improving the theory and practice of constructing 3-D and 4-D images of the earth from seismic echo soundings (see: Reflection seismology). The consortium was started in the 1970s by Jon Claerbout and is currently co-directed with Biondo Biondi.

SEP pioneered innovations in migration imaging, velocity estimation, dip moveout and slant stack. SEP has recently been involved in 3-D seismic applications such as velocity estimation, wavefield-continuation prestack migration, multidimensional image estimation, and 4-D (time-lapse) reservoir monitoring.

== History ==
SEP was founded by Jon Claerbout as a partnership between the Stanford University School of Earth Sciences Department of Geophysics and various industry partners who fund for SEP activities. SEP pioneered developments in migration imaging, velocity estimation, dip moveout and slant stack analysis.
