= Synthetic seismogram =

A synthetic seismogram is the result of forward modelling the seismic response of an input earth model, which is defined in terms of 1D, 2D, or 3D variations in physical properties. In hydrocarbon exploration, this is used to provide a 'tie' between changes in rock properties in a borehole and seismic reflection data at the same location. It can also be used either to test possible interpretation models for 2D and 3D seismic data or to model the response of the predicted geology as an aid to planning a seismic reflection survey. In the processing of wide-angle reflection and refraction (WARR) data, synthetic seismograms are used to further constrain the results of seismic tomography. In earthquake seismology, synthetic seismograms are used either to match the predicted effects of a particular earthquake source fault model with observed seismometer records or to help constrain the Earth's velocity structure. Synthetic seismograms are generated using specialized geophysical software.

== 1D synthetics ==
Seismic reflection data are initially only available in the time domain. In order that the geology encountered in a borehole can be tied to the seismic data, a 1D synthetic seismogram is generated. This is important in identifying the origin of seismic reflections seen on the seismic data. Density and velocity data are routinely measured down the borehole using wireline logging tools. These logs provide data with a sampling interval much smaller than the vertical resolution of the seismic data. The logs are therefore often averaged over intervals to produce what is known as a 'blocked-log'. This information is then used to calculate the variation in acoustic impedance down the well bore using the Zoeppritz equations. This acoustic impedance log is combined with the velocity data to generate a reflection coefficient series in time. This series is convolved with a seismic wavelet to produce the synthetic seismogram. The input seismic wavelet is chosen to match as closely as possible to that produced during the original seismic acquisition, paying particular attention to phase and frequency content.

== 1.5D seismic modelling ==
The convolutional 1D modelling produces seismograms contain approximations of primary reflections only. For more accurate modelling involving multiple reflections, head waves, guided waves, and surface waves, as well as transmission effects and geometrical spreading, full waveform modelling is required. For 1D elastic models, the most accurate approach to full waveform modelling is known as the reflectivity method. This method is based on the integral transform approach, whereby the wave field (cylindrical or spherical wave) is represented by a sum (integral) of time-harmonic plane waves. The reflection and transmission coefficients for individual plane waves propagating in a stack of layers can be computed analytically using a variety of methods, such as matrix propagator, global matrix, or invariant embedding. This group of methods is called 1.5D because the earth is represented by a 1D model (flat layers), while wave propagation is considered either in 2D (cylindrical waves) or 3D (spherical waves).

== 2D synthetic seismic modeling ==
A similar approach can be used to examine the seismic response of a 2D geological cross-section. This can be used to look at such things as the resolution of thin beds or the different responses of various fluids, e.g. oil, gas, or brine in a potential reservoir sand. It may also be used to test out different geometries of structures such as salt diapirs, to see which gives the best match to the original seismic data. A cross-section is built with density and seismic velocities assigned to each of the individual layers. These can be either constant within a layer or varying in a systematic fashion across the model both horizontally and vertically. The software program then runs a synthetic acquisition across the model to produce a set of 'shot gathers' that can be processed as if they were real seismic data to produce a synthetic 2D seismic section. The synthetic record is generated using either a ray-tracing algorithm or some form of full waveform modelling, depending on the purpose of the modelling. Ray-tracing is quick and sufficient for testing the illumination of the structure, but full waveform modelling will be necessary to accurately model the amplitude response.

== 3D synthetic seismic modelling ==
The approach can be further expanded to model the response of a 3D geological model. This is used to reduce the uncertainty in interpretation by modelling the response of the 3D model to a synthetic seismic acquisition that matches as closely as possible to that actually used in acquiring the data that has been interpreted. The synthetic seismic data is then processed using the same sequence as that used for the original data. This method can be used to model both 2D and 3D seismic data that has been acquired over the area of the geological model. During the planning of a seismic survey, 3D modelling can be used to test the effect of variation in seismic acquisition parameters, such as the shooting direction or the maximum offset between source and receiver, on the imaging of a particular geological structure.

== WARR data modelling ==
Wide Aperture Reflection and Refraction (WARR) models' initial processing is normally carried out using a tomographic approach in which the time of observed first arrivals is matched by varying the velocity structure of the subsurface. The model can be further refined using forward modelling to generate synthetic seismograms for individual shot gathers.

== Earthquake modelling ==
=== Source modelling ===
In areas that have a well understood velocity structure, it is possible to use synthetic seismograms to test out the estimated source parameters of an earthquake. Parameters such as the fault plane, slip vector, and rupture velocity can be varied to produce synthetic seismic responses at individual seismometers for comparison with the observed seismograms.

=== Velocity modelling ===
For seismic events of known type and location, it is possible to obtain detailed information about the Earth's structure, at various scales, by modelling the teleseismic response of the event.
