= Seismic wide-angle reflection and refraction =

Geophysical investigation technique

Seismic wide-angle reflection and refraction is a technique used in geophysical investigations of Earth's crust and upper mantle. It allows the development of a detailed model of seismic velocities beneath Earth's surface well beyond the reach of exploration boreholes. The velocities can then be used, often in combination with the interpretation of standard seismic reflection data and gravity data, to interpret the geology of the subsurface.

== Theory ==
In comparison to the typical seismic reflection survey, which is restricted to relatively small incidence angles due to the limited offsets between source and receiver, wide-angle reflection and refraction (WARR) data are acquired with long offsets, allowing the recording of both refracted and wide-angle reflection arrivals.

== Acquisition ==
The acquisition setup depends on the type of seismic source being used and the target of the investigation.

=== Source ===
The source of the seismic waves may be either "passive", e.g. naturally occurring sources, such as earthquakes, or anthropogenic sources, such as quarry blasts, or "active", sometimes referred to as "controlled source", e.g. explosive charges set off in shallow boreholes or seismic vibrators onshore or air guns offshore. Exceptionally, the sound waves from nuclear explosions have been used to look at the structure of the upper mantle down to the base of the transition zone at 660 km depth.

=== Receiver ===
The sound waves are normally recorded using 3-component seismometers, with ocean-bottom seismometers (OBS) used offshore. The three components allow the recording of S-waves as well as the P-waves that single component instruments can record. The offset range used depends on the depth of the target. For the top few kilometres of the crust, such as when investigating beneath a thick layer of basalt, a range of 10–20 km may be appropriate, while for the lower crust and mantle, offsets greater than 100 km are normally necessary.

== Modelling ==
The processing approach used in standard seismic reflection profiling is not appropriate for wide-angle data. The main modelling approach used for WARR profiles is to match predicted travel times, based on the geology, with those observed in the data. An initial model of variations in seismic velocity is set up, based on whatever knowledge is available from other sources. A ray tracing algorithm is used to calculate the travel times and the model is adjusted iteratively to reduce the misfit between observed and modelled times. Most modelling uses P-waves, but S-waves are also modelled in some cases.
