= Seismic inversion =

Geophysical process

In geophysics (primarily in oil-and-gas exploration/development), seismic inversion is the process of transforming seismic reflection data into a quantitative rock-property description of a reservoir. Seismic inversion may be pre- or post-stack, deterministic, random or geostatistical; it typically includes other reservoir measurements such as well logs and cores.

== Introduction ==
Geophysicists routinely perform seismic surveys to gather information about the geology of an oil or gas field. These surveys record sound waves which have traveled through the layers of rock and fluid in the earth. The amplitude and frequency of these waves can be estimated so that any side-lobe and tuning effects introduced by the wavelet may be removed.

Seismic data may be inspected and interpreted on its own without inversion, but this does not provide the most detailed view of the subsurface and can be misleading under certain conditions. Because of its efficiency and quality, most oil and gas companies now use seismic inversion to increase the resolution and reliability of the data and to improve estimation of rock properties including porosity and net pay.

There are many different techniques used in seismic inversion. These can be roughly grouped into two categories:

1. pre-stack or post-stack
2. seismic resolution or well-log resolution

The combination of these categories yields four technical approaches to the inversion problem, and the selection of a specific technique depends on the desired objective and the characteristics of the subsurface rocks. Although the order presented reflects advances in inversion techniques over the past 20 years, each grouping still has valid uses in particular projects or as part of a larger workflow.

== Wavelet estimation ==
All modern seismic inversion methods require seismic data and a wavelet estimated from the data. Typically, a reflection coefficient series from a well within the boundaries of the seismic survey is used to estimate the wavelet phase and frequency. Accurate wavelet estimation is critical to the success of any seismic inversion. The inferred shape of the seismic wavelet may strongly influence the seismic inversion results and, thus, subsequent assessments of the reservoir quality.

Wavelet amplitude and phase spectra are estimated statistically from either the seismic data alone or from a combination of seismic data and well control using wells with available sonic and density curves. After the seismic wavelet is estimated, it is used to estimate seismic reflection coefficients in the seismic inversion.

When the estimated (constant) phase of the statistical wavelet is consistent with the final result, the wavelet estimation converges more quickly than when starting with a zero phase assumption. Minor edits and "stretch and squeeze" may be applied to the well to better align the events. Accurate wavelet estimation requires the accurate tie of the impedance log to the seismic. Errors in well tie can result in phase or frequency artifacts in the wavelet estimation. Once the wavelet is identified, seismic inversion computes a synthetic log for every seismic trace. To ensure quality, the inversion result is convolved with the wavelet to produce synthetic seismic traces which are compared to the original seismic.

== Components of inversion ==
Inversion includes both seismic field data and well data, where well data serves to add the high frequency below the seismic band and to constrain the inversion. Well logs are first conditioned and edited to ensure there is a suitable relationship between impedance logs and the desired properties. The logs are then converted to time, filtered to approximate the seismic bandwidth and edited for borehole effects, balanced and classified by quality.

Seismic data is band-limited, reducing resolution and quality. To extend the frequency band available, low-frequency data is derived from log data, pre-stack depth or time migrated velocities and/or a regional gradient. High frequency can be derived from well control or geostatistical analysis.

Initial inversions are often run with relaxed constraints, starting with the seismic and then adding limited-trend data from the wells. This provides a rough overview of the reservoir in an unbiased manner. It is critical at this point to evaluate the accuracy of the tie between the inversion results and the wells, and between the original seismic data and the derived synthetics. It is also important to ensure that the wavelet matches the phase and frequency of seismic data.

Without a wavelet, the solution is not unique. Deterministic inversions address this problem by constraining the answer in some way, usually to well log data. Stochastic inversions address this problem by generating a range of plausible solutions, which can then be narrowed through testing for best fit against various measurements (including production data).

== Post-stack seismic resolution inversion ==
An example of a post-stack seismic resolution inversion technique is the constrained sparse-spike inversion (CSSI). This assumes a limited number of reflection coefficients, with larger amplitude. The inversion results in acoustic impedance (AI), which is the product of rock density and p-wave velocity. Unlike seismic reflection data (which is an interface property) AI is a rock property. The model generated is of higher quality, and does not suffer from tuning and interference caused by the wavelet.

CSSI transforms seismic data to a pseudo-acoustic impedance log at every trace. Acoustic impedance is used to produce more accurate and detailed structural and stratigraphic interpretations than can be obtained from seismic (or seismic attribute) interpretation. In many geological environments acoustic impedance has a strong relationship to petrophysical properties such as porosity, lithology, and fluid saturation.

A good (CSSI) algorithm will produce four high-quality acoustic impedance volumes from full or post-stack seismic data: full-bandwidth impedance, bandlimited Impedance, reflectivity model, and low-frequency component. Each of these components can be inspected for its contribution to the solution and to check the results for quality. To further adapt the algorithm mathematics to the behavior of real rocks in the subsurface, some CSSI algorithms use a mixed-norm approach and allow a weighting factor between minimizing the sparsity of the solution and minimizing the misfit of the residual traces.

== Pre-stack seismic resolution inversion ==
Pre-stack inversion is often used when post-stack inversion fails to sufficiently differentiate geologic features with similar P-impedance signatures. Simultaneous inversion solves for S-impedance and density, in addition to P-impedance. While many geologic features can express similar P-impedance characteristics, few will share combined P-impedance and S-impedance traits (allowing improved separation and clarity). Often a feasibility study using the wells logs will indicate whether separation of the desired lithotype can be achieved with P-impedance alone or whether S-impedance is also required. This will dictate whether a pre- or post-stack inversion is needed.

Simultaneous Inversion (SI) is a pre-stack method that uses multiple offset or angle seismic sub-stacks and their associated wavelets as input; it generates P-impedance, S-impedance and density as outputs (although the density output resolution is rarely as high as the impedances). This helps improve discrimination between lithology, porosity and fluid effects. For each input partial stack, a unique wavelet is estimated. All models, partial stacks and wavelets are input to a single inversion algorithm — enabling inversion to effectively compensate for offset-dependent phase, bandwidth, tuning and NMO stretch effects.

The inversion algorithm works by first estimating angle-dependent P-wave reflectivities for the input-partial stacks. Next, these are used with the full Zoeppritz equations (or approximations, such as Aki–Richards, for some algorithms) to find band-limited elastic reflectivities. These are in turn merged with their low-frequency counterparts from the model and integrated to elastic properties. This approximate result is then improved in a final inversion for P-impedance, S-impedance and density, subject to various hard and soft constraints. One constraint can control the relation between density and compressional velocity; this is necessary when the range of angles is not great enough to be diagnostic of density.

An important part in the inversion procedure is the estimation of the seismic wavelets. This is accomplished by computing a filter that best shapes the angle-dependent well log reflection coefficients in the region of interest to the corresponding offset stack at the well locations. Reflection coefficients are calculated from P-sonic, S-sonic and density logs using the Zoeppritz equations. The wavelets, with amplitudes representative of each offset stack, are input directly into the inversion algorithm. Since a different wavelet is computed for each offset volume, compensation is automatically done for offset-dependent bandwidth, scaling and tuning effects. A near-stack wavelet can be used as the starting point for estimating the far-angle (or offset) wavelet.

No prior knowledge of the elastic parameters and density beyond the solution space defined by any hard constraints is provided at the well locations. This makes comparison of the filtered well logs and the inversion outputs at these locations a natural quality control. The lowest frequencies from the inversion are replaced with information from the geologic model since they are poorly constrained by the seismic data. When applied in global mode a spatial control term is added to the objective function and large subsets of traces are inverted simultaneously. The simultaneous inversion algorithm takes multiple angle-stacked seismic data sets and generates three elastic parameter volumes as output.

The resulting elastic parameters are real-rock properties that can be directly related to reservoir properties. The more advanced algorithms use the full Knott–Zoeppritz equations and there is full allowance for amplitude and phase variations with offset. This is done by deriving unique wavelets for each input-partial stack. The elastic parameters themselves can be directly constrained during the seismic inversion and rock-physics relationships can be applied, constraining pairs of elastic parameters to each other. Final elastic-parameter models optimally reproduce the input seismic, as this is part of the seismic inversion optimization.

== Post stack geostatistical inversion ==
Geostatistical inversion integrates high resolution well data with low resolution 3-D seismic, and provides a model with high vertical detail near and away from well control. This generates reservoir models with geologically-plausible shapes, and provides a clear quantification of uncertainty to assess risk. Highly detailed petrophysical models are generated, ready for input to reservoir-flow simulation.

Geostatistics differs from statistics in that it recognizes that only certain outcomes are geologically plausible. Geostatistical inversion integrates data from many sources and creates models that have greater resolution than the original seismic, match known geological patterns, and can be used for risk assessment and reduction.

Seismic, well logs and other input data are each represented as a probability density function (PDF), which provides a geostatistical description based on histograms and variograms. Together these define the chances of a particular value at a particular location, and the expected geological scale and composition throughout the modeled area.

Unlike conventional inversion and geomodeling algorithms, geostatistical inversion takes a one-step approach, solving for impedance and discrete property types or lithofacies at the same time. Taking this approach speeds the process and improves accuracy.

Individual PDFs are merged using bayesian inference techniques, resulting in a posterior PDF conditioned to the whole data set. The algorithm determines the weighting of each data source, eliminating potential bias. The posterior PDF is then input to a Markov chain Monte Carlo algorithm to generate realistic models of impedance and lithofacies, which are then used to co-simulate rock properties such as porosity. These processes are typically iterated until a model emerges that matches all information. Even with the best model, some uncertainty remains. Uncertainty can be estimated using random seeds to generate a range of realizations. This is especially useful when dealing with parameters that are sensitive to change; an analysis of this sort enables greater understanding of development risk.

== Pre-stack log-detail inversion ==
Amplitude versus offset (AVO) (AVA) geostatistical inversion incorporates simultaneous AVO (AVA) inversion into the geostatistical inversion algorithm so high resolution, geostatistics, and AVO may be attained in a single method. The output model (realizations) are consistent with well log information, AVO seismic data, and honor rock property relationships found in the wells. The algorithm also simultaneously produces elastic properties (P-impedance, S-impedance and density) and lithology volumes, instead of sequentially solving for lithology first and then populating the cell with impedance and density values. Because all output models match all input data, uncertainty can be quantitatively assessed to determine the range of reservoir possibilities within the constraining data.

AVA geostatistical inversion software uses leading-edge geostatistical techniques, including Markov chain Monte Carlo (MCMC) sampling and pluri-Gaussian lithology modeling. It is thus possible to exploit "informational synergies" to retrieve details that deterministic inversion techniques blur out or omit. As a result, geoscientists are more successful in reconstructing both the overall structure and the fine details of the reservoir. The use of multiple-angle-stack seismic volumes in AVA geostatistical inversion enables further evaluation of elastic rock properties and probable lithology or seismic facies and fluid distributions with greater accuracy.

The process begins with a detailed petrophysical analysis and well log calibration. The calibration process replaces unreliable and missing sonic and density measurements with synthesized values from calibrated petrophysical and rock-physics models. Well log information is used in the inversion process to derive wavelets, supply the low frequency component not present in the seismic data, and to verify and analyze the final results. Next, horizon and log data are used to construct the stratigraphic framework for the statistical information to build the models. In this way, the log data is only used for generating statistics within similar rock types within the stratigraphic layers of the earth.

Wavelet analysis is conducted by extracting a filter from each of the seismic volumes using the well elastic (angle or offset) impedance as the desired output. The quality of the inversion result is dependent upon the extracted seismic wavelets. This requires accurate p-sonic, s-sonic and density logs tied to the appropriate events on the seismic data. Wavelets are extracted individually for each well. A final "multi-well" wavelet is then extracted for each volume using the best individual well ties and used as input to the inversion.

Histograms and variograms are generated for each stratigraphic layer and lithology, and preliminary simulations are run on small areas. The AVA geostatistical inversion is then run to generate the desired number of realizations, which match all the input data. The results are quality controlled by direct comparison of the inverted rock property volumes against the well logs. Further QC involves review by a multidisciplinary team of all input parameters and the results of the simulation. Analysis of multiple realizations produces mean (P50) property cubes or maps. Most often these are lithology or seismic facies cubes and predicted lithology or facies probabilities, but other outputs are also possible. Selected lithology and facies cubes are also generated for P15 and P85 probabilities (for example). Reservoir 3-D bodies of hydrocarbon-bearing units are captured with their corresponding rock properties, and the uncertainty in reservoir size and properties is quantified.

== See also ==
- Linear seismic inversion
- Seismic to simulation
- Exploration geophysics
- Full waveform inversion
- Model inversion
