= Normal moveout =

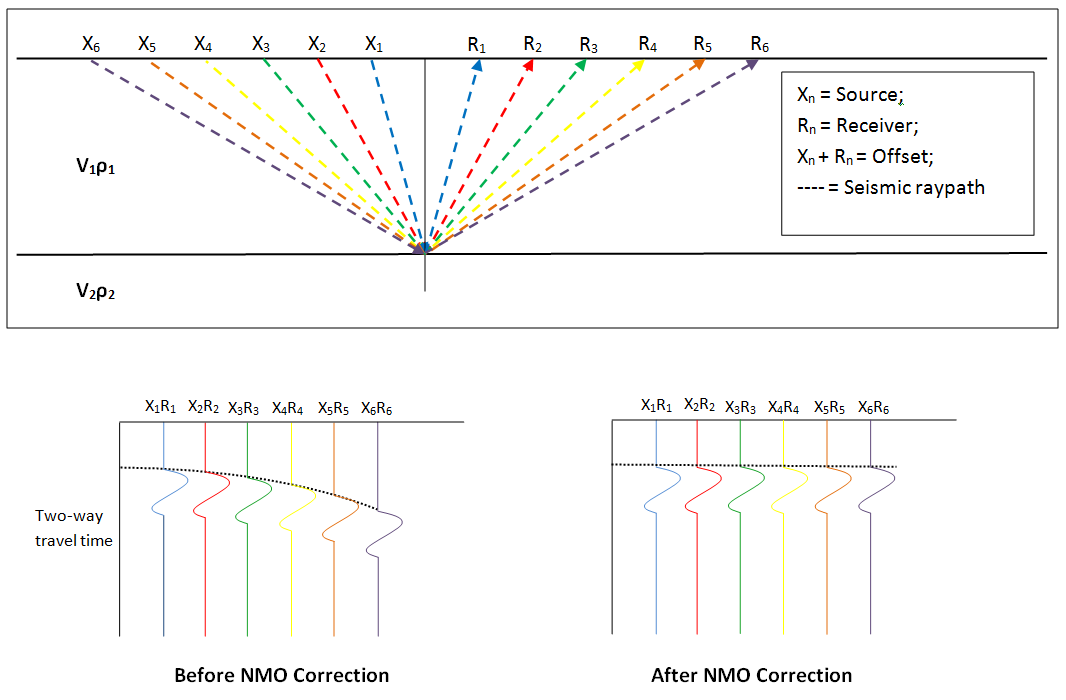
Seismic data is sorted by common midpoint and then corrected for normal moveout

In reflection seismology, normal moveout (NMO) describes the effect that the distance between a seismic source and a receiver (the offset) has on the arrival time of a reflection in the form of an increase of time with offset. The relationship between arrival time and offset is hyperbolic and it is the principal criterion that a geophysicist uses to decide whether an event is a reflection or not. It is distinguished from dip moveout (DMO), the systematic change in arrival time due to a dipping layer.

The normal moveout depends on complex combination of factors including the velocity above the reflector, offset, dip of the reflector and the source receiver azimuth in relation to the dip of the reflector. For a flat, horizontal reflector, the traveltime equation is:

$t^2 = t_0^2 + \frac{x^2}{v^2}$

where x = offset; v = velocity of the medium above the reflecting interface; $t_0$ = travel time at zero offset, when the source and receiver are in the same place.

According to W. Harry Mayne, inventor of the Common Point Reflection Method in 1950, in order to avoid the "smearing" of recorded seismic data caused by the use of geophone sensor arrays, I needed a very long array to attenuate the noise, yet each point of the array needed to represent the same reflection point of the subsurface. For a non-dipping reflector, this meant that the source and receiver station would have to move the same distance-in opposite directions-from the reflection (or mid-) point. One problem still remained. The reflections had different traveltimes on each pair of sources and receivers, so it would be necessary to correct for these differences (moveouts) prior to array formation." Coupled with the normal moveout correction, Mayne stated, "the method was primarily intended to attenuate systematic surface noise, and to average out near-surface aberrations in travel paths. It was soon realized, however, that it alone could also substantially attenuate the insidious multiple reflection."
