= Seismic Unix =

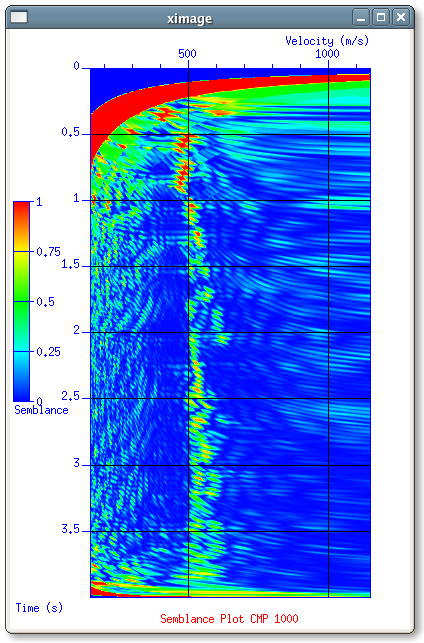
- Velocity Analysis with SU
- Developers: CWP, John Stockwell
- Stable release: SU 44R28 / March 23, 2023
- Operating system: Unix, Linux, Solaris, Mac OS X, Cygwin
- Type: Technical computing
- License: New BSD license
- Website: Seismic Unix Home

Seismic Unix is an open source seismic utilities package which was supported by the Center for Wave Phenomena (CWP) at the Colorado School of Mines (CSM). Currently it is supported by John Stockwell.

== History ==
Einar Kjartansson began developing what became known as SU, initially called the SY package, in the late 1970s as a graduate student at Jon Claerbout's Stanford Exploration Project (SEP). He continued its development after becoming a professor at the University of Utah in the early 1980s. During a 1984 visit to SEP, Kjartansson introduced the software to fellow Stanford graduate student Shuki Ronen, who developed it further through 1986 with contributions from other SEP students. The package drew on earlier SEP software and built on foundations laid by Claerbout and students including Rob Clayton, Stew Levin, Dave Hale, Jeff Thorson, and Chuck Sword, who had pioneered Unix-based seismic processing in the 1970s and early 1980s.

Ronen brought the software to the Center for Wave Phenomena (CWP) at the Colorado School of Mines in 1986 during a postdoctoral year there, working with Jack Cohen to develop it into a distributable package. Chris Liner contributed graphics code during the software's early, pre-workstation era as a CWP student, and later promoted its use in his own students' research at the University of Houston. Craig Artley also contributed graphics code as a CWP student and has continued contributing to the package since. Dave Hale wrote core processing code and much of its scientific and graphics libraries.

John Stockwell joined the project in 1989 and was largely responsible for its build system. He has served as the project's main contact since SU's first public release in September 1992 (Release 19), and became principal investigator after Jack Cohen's death in 1996, a role he has held since. The codebase's line count more than quadrupled between 1996 and 2011.

== Syntax ==
The Seismic Unix routines run under the Unix terminal, and can get maximum efficiency when using it with Bourne shell (sh) or Bourne-again shell (bash) scripting techniques.

=== Simple routines ===
Many of the programs run simply by a command on the terminal, for instance, to visualize a seismogram, as wiggle traces

$ suxwigb < seismogram.su

or as an image plot

$ suximage < seismogram.su

=== More elaborated routines ===
It is also possible, to use bash features to elaborate more complex processing structures:

$ for ((i=1;i<=100;i++)); do \
> sufdmod2 < model.bin > output.mov nx=200 nz=300 tmax=5 xs=$i zs=0 hsfile=seismogram.$i.su \
> done

In the example above Seismic Unix will create 100 seismograms in 100 different source positions

== SU Data ==
SU data can contain headers.

--header—data—header—data--...

== SU Programs ==
Seismic Unix has many of the processes needed on the geophysical processing. It is possible to use it to manipulate and create your own seismograms, and also to convert them between the SU standard file and the industry standard, the SEG Y.

Here you can find a list of the programs that the SU package has, with a brief description and a link to its help page.

== Awards ==
- 2002 - Society of Exploration Geophysicists Special Commendation
- 1994 - University to Industry award from the Colorado chapter of the Technology Transfer Society

== See also ==
- SUguide Seismic Unix Install Guide (hosted in Brazilian page)
- Seismic Unix wiki
- New Seismic Unix wiki 2019
