= SEG-Y =

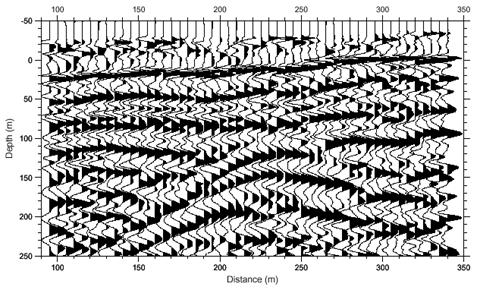
- An image of seismic line that was originally encoded in the SEG-Y format.
- Filename extension: .sgy, .segy
- Developed by: SEG Technical Standards Committee
- Initial release: 1975; 51 years ago
- Latest release: rev 2.1; October 2023; 2 years ago
- Type of format: Reflection seismology data
- Extended from: SEG "Ex"
- Website: https://library.seg.org/pb-assets/technical-standards/seg_y_rev1-1686080991247.pdf

The SEG-Y (sometimes SEG Y) file format is one of several standards developed by the Society of Exploration Geophysicists (SEG) for storing geophysical data. It has become the most popular format in seismic exploration, allowing storage of traces, trace header data, and volume header data.

The format is an open standard, and is controlled by the SEG Technical Standards Committee, a non-profit organization.

== History ==
The format was originally developed in 1973 to store single-line seismic reflection digital data on magnetic tapes. The specification was published in 1975.

The format and its name evolved from the SEG "Ex" or Exchange Tape Format. However, since its release, there have been significant advancements in geophysical data acquisition, such as 3-dimensional seismic techniques and high speed, high capacity recording.

The most recent revision of the SEG-Y format was published in 2023, named the rev 2.1 specification. It still features certain legacies of the original format (referred as rev 0), such as an optional SEG-Y tape label, the main 3200 byte textual EBCDIC character encoded tape header and a 400 byte binary header.

== Data structure ==
SEG-Y Files are stored in a hierarchical byte-stream format that combines both textual and binary data segments. The following chart shows the byte stream structure of revision 1 (2002), with revision 2 (2017) only adding an optional data trailer for 1 or more 3200-byte records at the end:

Since the first SEG-Y standard was published, many companies dealing with seismic data have produced variants of the SEG-Y standard which have run contrary to the aims of defining a standard for universal interchange, thus generally causing confusion and delay when data received by a company in expected SEG-Y format turns out to be a variant of that format. Initially, many of these derived from the fact that the format was based on the de facto standard of using IBM computers for digital processing where character data was coded in EBCDIC and number data in IBM Floating Point, whereas processing systems in use quickly evolved based on ASCII character and IEEE number representations.

Even before the SEG-Y standard was agreed and published, earlier seismic data format standards published by the SEG such as SEG-A, SEG-B and SEG-C were modified by seismic acquisition companies, though not to the wide extent that the SEG-Y format has been modified by seismic acquisition and processing companies and oil companies using their own inhouse software.

As magnetic tape technology developed, the original SEG-Y format using individual small data blocks for each distinct seismic trace became very inefficient in terms of tape performance so the first and subsequent revisions allowed for larger tape data blocks containing many individual traces.

There have been many suggestions for including different kinds of metadata within the standard over the years, since when the standard was first proposed the processes of acquisition and processing were technologically much simpler.

For example geographical positioning information either real world or relative wasn't stored in the trace header at acquisition or final processing whereas it is routine today.

However, the relative simplicity of the SEG-Y format has meant that it has worked well for interchange of seismic data allowing anyone to read and understand data recorded in the 1970s on half inch magnetic tape as easily as reading it on modern tape media or from a disk file, as long as the standard has been adhered to.

While SEG-Y format data is still stored on magnetic tape as a permanent archive, SEG-Y data is increasingly stored as disk files for online and near-line ease of access, and later format revisions allow for character and number data to be stored in native system representations as ASCII and IEEE.

== See also ==
- Reflection seismology
