= Geophone =

Recording device in geology

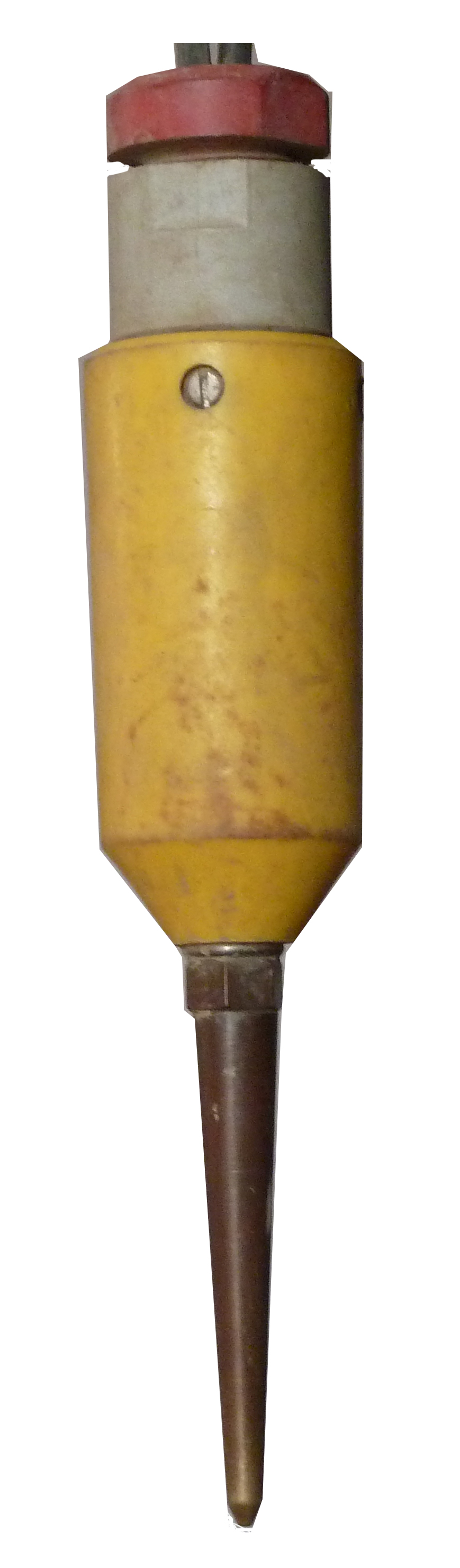
Geophone (SM-24), frequency band 10 Hz to 240 Hz, standard resistance 375 Ω

A geophone is a device that converts ground movement (velocity) into voltage, which may be recorded at a recording station. The deviation of this measured voltage from the base line is called the seismic response and is analyzed for structure of the Earth.

== Etymology ==
The term geophone derives from the Greek word "γῆ (ge) " meaning "earth" and "phone" meaning "sound".

== Construction ==
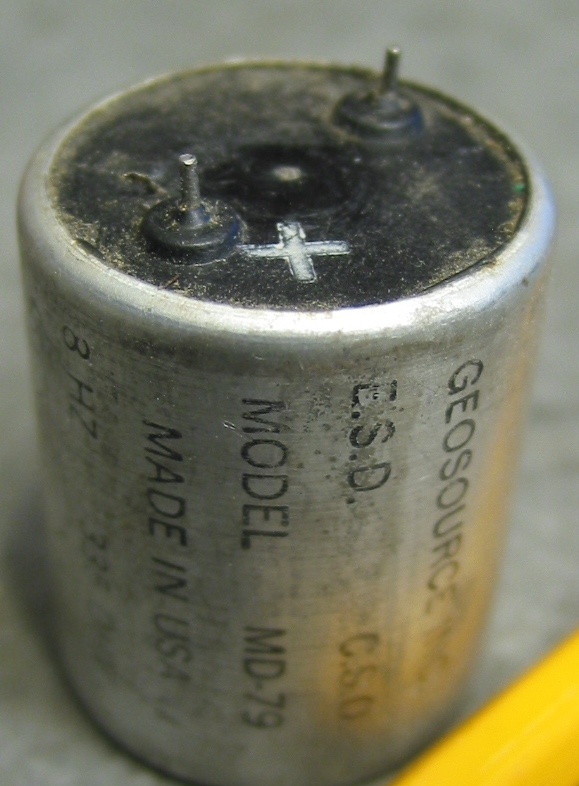
Geosource Inc. MD-79—8 Hz, 335 Ω geophone

Geophones have historically been passive analog devices and typically comprise a spring-mounted wire coil moving within the field of a case-mounted permanent magnet to generate an electrical signal. Recent designs have been based on microelectromechanical systems (MEMS) technology which generates an electrical response to ground motion through an active feedback circuit to maintain the position of a small piece of silicon.

The response of a coil/magnet geophone is proportional to ground velocity, while MEMS devices usually respond proportional to acceleration. MEMS have a much higher noise level (50 dB velocity higher) than geophones and can only be used in strong motion or active seismic applications.

== Frequency response ==
The frequency response of a geophone is that of a harmonic oscillator, fully determined by corner frequency (typically around 10 Hz) and damping (typically 0.707). Since the corner frequency is proportional to the inverse square root of the moving mass, geophones with low corner frequencies (< 1 Hz) become impractical. It is possible to lower the corner frequency electronically, at the price of higher noise and cost.

Although waves passing through the Earth have a three-dimensional nature, geophones are normally constrained to respond to single dimension - usually the vertical. However, some applications require the full wave to be used and three-component or 3-C geophones are used. In analog devices, three moving coil elements are mounted in an orthogonal arrangement within a single case.

== Distinction from seismometers ==
Geophones are similar to seismometers in their design and are also used to register seismic waves. In the past, there were clear differences between geophones and seismometers. Compared to conventional geophones, seismometers are more suitable for detecting extremely small ground movements as they cover a wider frequency band, including the frequency range below their natural frequency, usually from 0.01 to 50 Hz. In conventional geophones, the frequency band is in the range of 1-15 Hz. They are cheaper than seismometers and are therefore more commonly used in arrays for large area detection with better specialised resolution. However, with the development of new technologies, the frequency coverage in compact devices has also increased significantly, so that geophones can cover frequency bands from 0 to 500 Hz and the boundaries between geophones and seismometers are becoming blurred.

== Uses ==
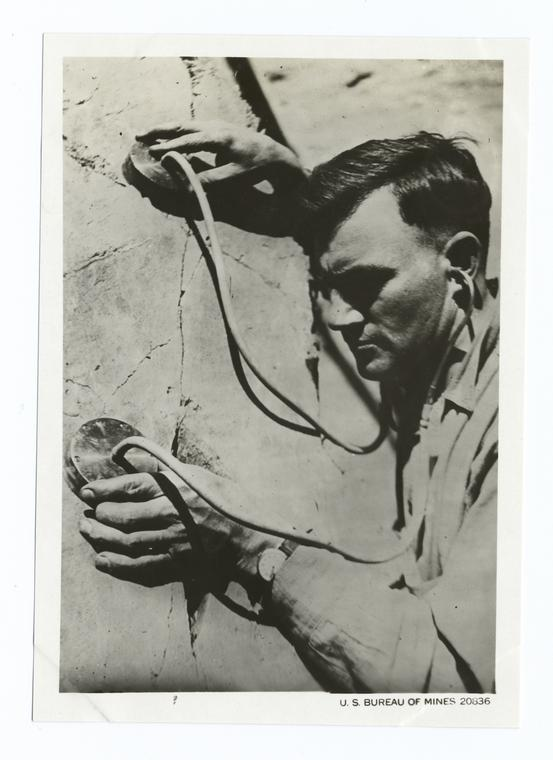
Man using a geophone

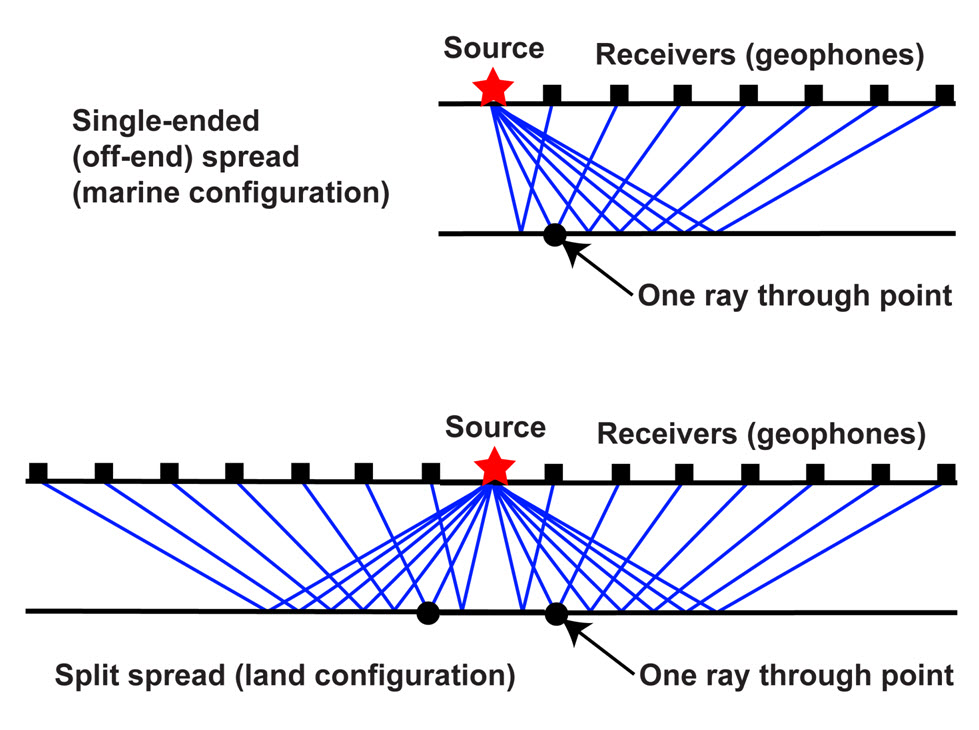
Single End Spread & Split Stread

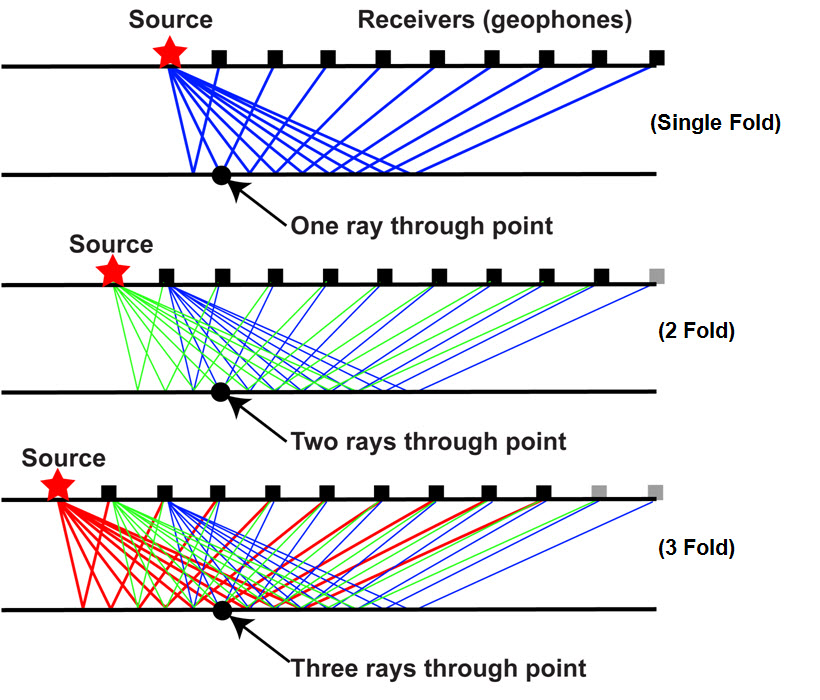
Source Receivers single fold-3 Fold

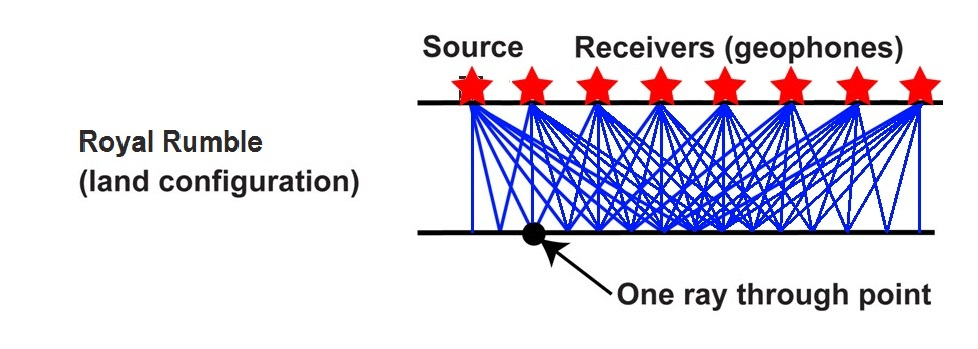
Royal Rumble

The majority of geophones are used in reflection seismology to record the energy waves reflected by the subsurface geology. In this case the primary interest is in the vertical motion of the Earth's surface. However, not all the waves are upwards traveling. A strong, horizontally transmitted wave known as ground-roll also generates vertical motion that can obliterate the weaker vertical signals. By using large areal arrays tuned to the wavelength of the ground-roll the dominant noise signals can be attenuated and the weaker data signals reinforced.

Analog geophones are very sensitive devices which can respond to very distant tremors. These small signals can be drowned by larger signals from local sources. It is possible though to recover the small signals caused by large but distant events by correlating signals from several geophones deployed in an array. Signals which are registered only at one or few geophones can be attributed to unwanted, local events and thus discarded. It can be assumed that small signals that register uniformly at all geophones in an array can be attributed to a distant and therefore significant event.

The sensitivity of passive geophones is typically 30 volts per (meter per second), so they are in general not a replacement for broadband seismometers.

Conversely, some applications of geophones are interested only in very local events. A notable example is in the application of remote ground sensors (RGS) incorporated in unattended ground sensor (UGS) systems. In such an application there is an area of interest which when penetrated a system operator is to be informed, perhaps by an alert which could be accompanied by supporting photographic data.

Geophones were used on the Moon for a number of active and passive experiments as part of the Apollo Lunar Surface Experiments Package.

== See also ==
- Accelerometer
- Hydrophone
- Michelson interferometer
- Seismometer
