= Reflection seismology =

Exploration of subsurface properties with seismology

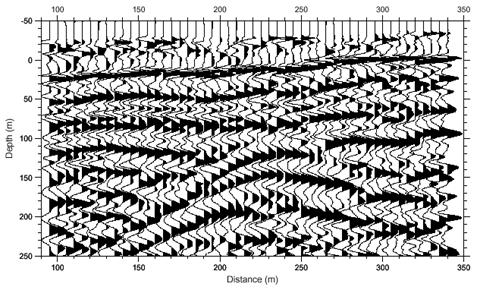
Seismic reflection data

Reflection seismology (or seismic reflection) is a method of exploration geophysics that uses the principles of seismology to estimate the properties of the Earth's subsurface from reflected seismic waves. The method requires a controlled seismic source of energy, such as dynamite or Tovex blast, a specialized air gun or a seismic vibrator. Reflection seismology is similar to sonar and echolocation.

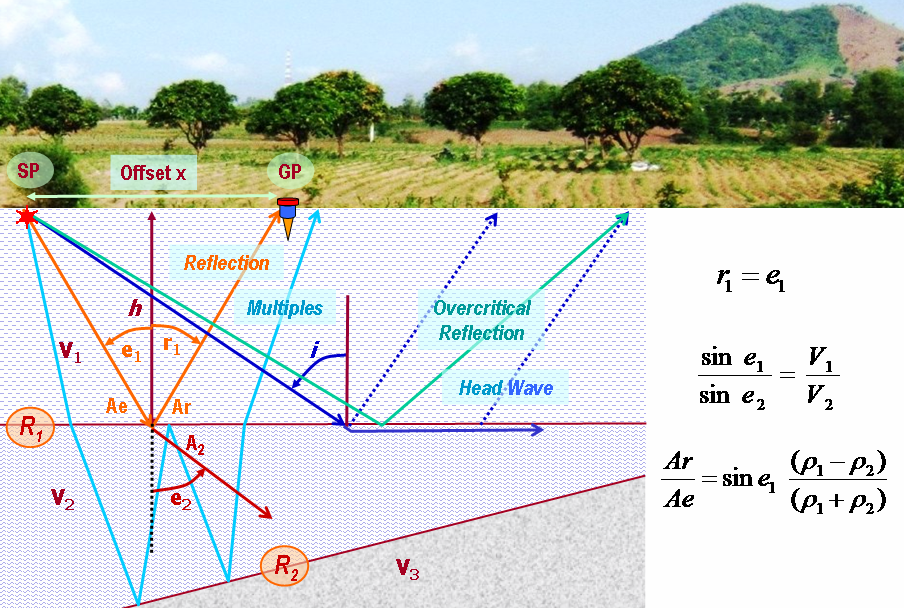
Seismic Reflection Outlines

== History ==
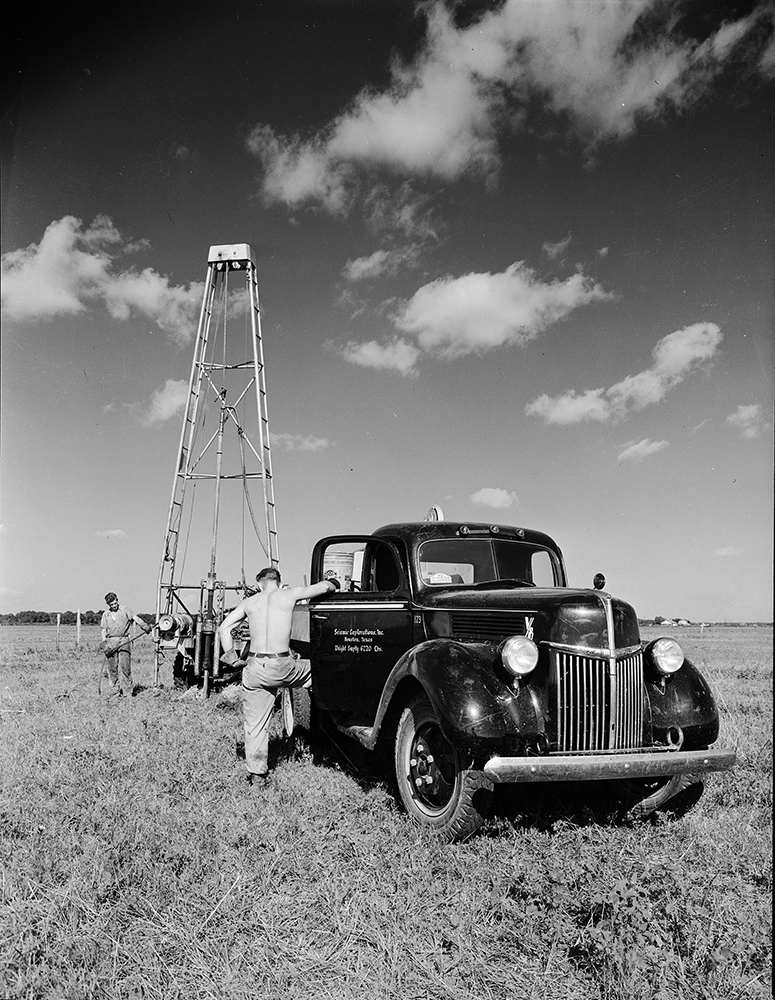
Seismic testing in 1940

Reflections and refractions of seismic waves at geologic interfaces within the Earth were first observed on recordings of earthquake-generated seismic waves. The basic model of the Earth's deep interior is based on observations of earthquake-generated seismic waves transmitted through the Earth's interior (e.g., Mohorovičić, 1910). The use of human-generated seismic waves to map in detail the geology of the upper few kilometers of the Earth's crust followed shortly thereafter and has developed mainly due to commercial enterprise, particularly the petroleum industry.

Seismic reflection exploration grew out of the seismic refraction exploration method, which was used to find oil associated with salt domes. Ludger Mintrop, a German mine surveyor, devised a mechanical seismograph in 1914 that he successfully used to detect salt domes in Germany. He applied for a German patent in 1919 that was issued in 1926. In 1921 he founded the company Seismos, which was hired to conduct seismic exploration in Texas and Mexico, resulting in the first commercial discovery of oil using the refraction seismic method in 1924. The 1924 discovery of the Orchard salt dome in Texas led to a boom in seismic refraction exploration along the Gulf Coast, but by 1930 the method had led to the discovery of most of the shallow Louann Salt domes, and the refraction seismic method faded.

After WWI, those involved in the development of commercial applications of seismic waves included Mintrop, Reginald Fessenden, John Clarence Karcher, E. A. Eckhardt, William P. Haseman, and Burton McCollum. In 1920, Haseman, Karcher, Eckhardt and McCollum founded the Geological Engineering Company. In June 1921, Karcher, Haseman, I. Perrine and W. C. Kite recorded the first exploration reflection seismograph near Oklahoma City, Oklahoma.

Early reflection seismology was viewed with skepticism by many in the oil industry. An early advocate of the method commented:

"As one who personally tried to introduce the method into general consulting practice, the senior writer can definitely recall many times when reflections were not even considered on a par with the divining rod, for at least that device had a background of tradition."

The Geological Engineering Company folded due to a drop in the price of oil. In 1925, oil prices had rebounded, and Karcher helped to form Geophysical Research Corporation (GRC) as part of the oil company Amerada. In 1930, Karcher left GRC and helped to found Geophysical Service Incorporated (GSI). GSI was one of the most successful seismic contracting companies for over 50 years and was the parent of an even more successful company, Texas Instruments. Early GSI employee Henry Salvatori left that company in 1933 to found another major seismic contractor, Western Geophysical. Many other companies using reflection seismology in hydrocarbon exploration, hydrology, engineering studies, and other applications have been formed since the method was first invented. Major service companies in recent years have included CGG, ION Geophysical, Petroleum Geo-Services, Polarcus, TGS and WesternGeco, but since the oil price crash of 2015, providers of seismic services have continued to struggle financially such as Polarcus, whilst companies that were seismic acquisition industry leaders just ten years ago such as CGG and WesternGeco have now removed themselves from the seismic acquisition environment entirely and restructured to focus upon their existing seismic data libraries, seismic data management and non-seismic related oilfield services.

The practice has long been called doodlebugging and field crews called doodlebuggers, but many geophysicists have historically rejected these labels to differentiate the legitimate practice of seismology from various ineffective, pseudoscientific, and sometimes deliberately fraudulent methods of dowsing for oil.

== Summary of the method ==
Seismic waves are mechanical perturbations that travel in the Earth at a speed governed by the acoustic impedance of the medium in which they are travelling. The acoustic (or seismic) impedance, Z, is defined by the equation:

$$Z=v\rho \$$,

where v is the seismic wave velocity and ρ (Greek rho) is the density of the rock.

When a seismic wave travelling through the Earth encounters an interface between two materials with different acoustic impedances, some of the wave energy will reflect off the interface and some will refract through the interface. At its most basic, the seismic reflection technique consists of generating seismic waves and measuring the time taken for the waves to travel from the source, reflect off an interface and be detected by an array of receivers (such as geophones, hydrophones, and DAS) at the surface. Knowing the travel times from the source to various receivers, and the velocity of the seismic waves, a geophysicist then attempts to reconstruct the pathways of the waves in order to build up an image of the subsurface.

In common with other geophysical methods, reflection seismology may be seen as a type of inverse problem. That is, given a set of data collected by experimentation and the physical laws that apply to the experiment, the experimenter wishes to develop an abstract model of the physical system being studied. In the case of reflection seismology, the experimental data are recorded seismograms, and the desired result is a model of the structure and physical properties of the Earth's crust. In common with other types of inverse problems, the results obtained from reflection seismology are usually not unique (more than one model adequately fits the data) and may be sensitive to relatively small errors in data collection, processing, or analysis. For these reasons, great care must be taken when interpreting the results of a reflection seismic survey.

=== The reflection experiment ===
The general principle of seismic reflection is to send elastic waves (using an energy source such as dynamite explosion, weightdrop or Vibroseis) into the Earth, where each layer within the Earth reflects a portion of the wave's energy back and allows the rest to refract through. These reflected energy waves are recorded over a predetermined time period (called the record length) by receivers that detect the motion of the ground in which they are placed. On land, the typical receiver used is a small, portable instrument known as a geophone, which converts ground motion into an analogue electrical signal. In water, hydrophones are used, which convert pressure changes into electrical signals. Each receiver's response to a single shot is known as a “trace” and is recorded onto a data storage device, then the shot location is moved along and the process is repeated. Typically, the recorded signals are subjected to significant amounts of signal processing.

=== Reflection and transmission at normal incidence ===
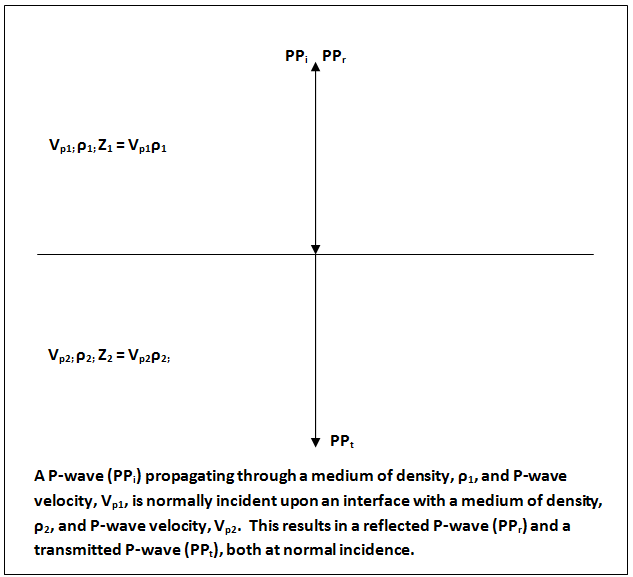
P-wave reflects off an interface at normal incidence

When a seismic P-wave encounters a boundary between two materials with different acoustic impedances, some of the energy in the wave will be reflected at the boundary, while some of the energy will be transmitted through the boundary. The amplitude of the reflected wave is predicted by multiplying the amplitude of the incident wave by the seismic reflection coefficient $R$, determined by the impedance contrast between the two materials.

For a wave that hits a boundary at normal incidence (head-on), the expression for the reflection coefficient is simply

$$R=\frac{Z_2 - Z_1}{Z_2 + Z_1}$$,

where $Z_1$ and $Z_2$ are the impedance of the first and second medium, respectively.

Similarly, the amplitude of the incident wave is multiplied by the transmission coefficient $T$ to predict the amplitude of the wave transmitted through the boundary. The formula for the normal-incidence transmission coefficient is

$T=1+R=\frac{2 Z_2}{(Z_2 + Z_1)}$.

As the sum of the energies of the reflected and transmitted wave has to be equal to the energy of the incident wave, it is easy to show that

$$\frac{R^2}{Z_1}+\frac{T^2}{Z_2}=\frac{Z_2(Z_2 - Z_1)^2+4Z_1Z_2^2}{Z_1Z_2(Z_1+Z_2)^2}=\frac{1}{Z_1}$$.

By observing changes in the strength of reflections, seismologists can infer changes in the seismic impedances. In turn, they use this information to infer changes in the properties of the rocks at the interface, such as density and wave velocity, by means of seismic inversion.

=== Reflection and transmission at non-normal incidence ===
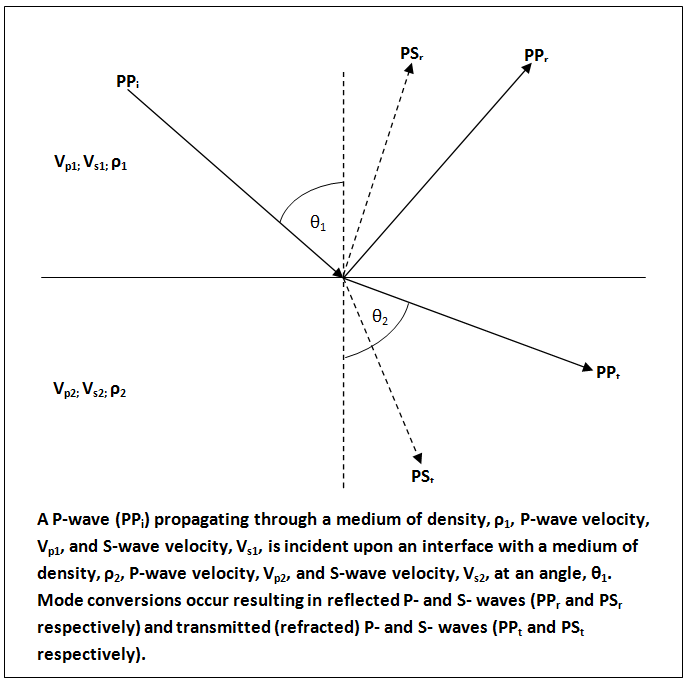
Diagram showing the mode conversions that occur when a P-wave reflects off an interface at non-normal incidence

The situation becomes much more complicated in the case of non-normal incidence, due to mode conversion between P-waves and S-waves, and is described by the Zoeppritz equations. In 1919, Karl Zoeppritz derived 4 equations that determine the amplitudes of reflected and refracted waves at a planar interface for an incident P-wave as a function of the angle of incidence and six independent elastic parameters. These equations have 4 unknowns and can be solved but they do not give an intuitive understanding for how the reflection amplitudes vary with the rock properties involved.

The reflection and transmission coefficients, which govern the amplitude of each reflection, vary with angle of incidence and can be used to obtain information about (among many other things) the fluid content of the rock. Practical use of non-normal incidence phenomena, known as AVO (see amplitude versus offset) has been facilitated by theoretical work to derive workable approximations to the Zoeppritz equations and by advances in computer processing capacity. AVO studies attempt with some success to predict the fluid content (oil, gas, or water) of potential reservoirs, to lower the risk of drilling unproductive wells and to identify new petroleum reservoirs. The 3-term simplification of the Zoeppritz equations that is most commonly used was developed in 1985 and is known as the "Shuey equation". A further 2-term simplification is known as the "Shuey approximation", is valid for angles of incidence less than 30 degrees (usually the case in seismic surveys) and is given below:

$$R(\theta ) = R(0) + G \sin^2 \theta$$

where $R(0)$ = reflection coefficient at zero-offset (normal incidence); $G$ = AVO gradient, describing reflection behaviour at intermediate offsets and $(\theta)$ = angle of incidence. This equation reduces to that of normal incidence at $(\theta)$=0.

=== Interpretation of reflections ===
The time it takes for a reflection from a particular boundary to arrive at the geophone is called the travel time. If the seismic wave velocity in the rock is known, then the travel time may be used to estimate the depth to the reflector. For a simple vertically traveling wave, the travel time $t$ from the surface to the reflector and back is called the Two-Way Time (TWT) and is given by the formula

$$t = 2\frac{d}{V}$$,

where $d$ is the depth of the reflector and $V$ is the wave velocity in the rock.

A series of apparently related reflections on several seismograms is often referred to as a reflection event. By correlating reflection events, a seismologist can create an estimated cross-section of the geologic structure that generated the reflections.

=== Sources of noise ===
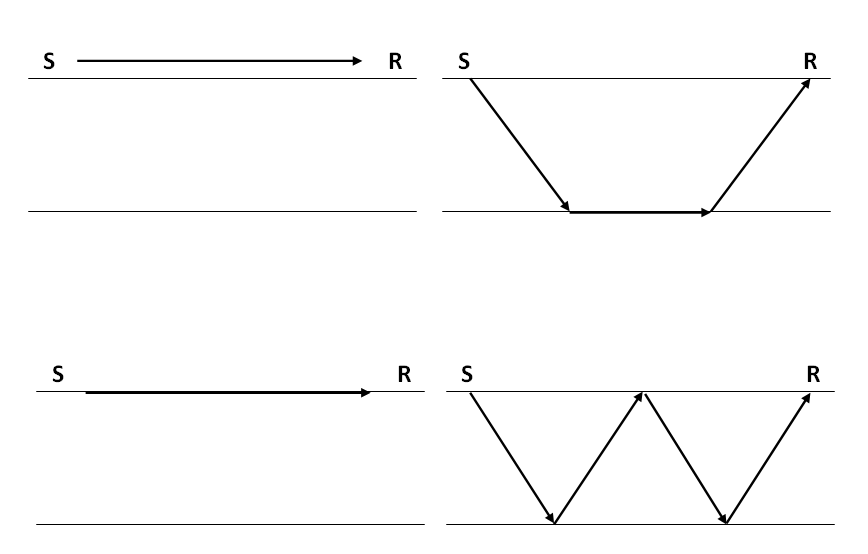
Sources of noise on a seismic record. Top-left: air wave; top-right: head wave; bottom-left: surface wave; bottom-right: multiple.

In addition to reflections off interfaces within the subsurface, there are a number of other seismic responses detected by receivers and are either unwanted or unneeded:

==== Air wave ====
The airwave travels directly from the source to the receiver and is an example of coherent noise. It is easily recognizable because it travels at a speed of 330 m/s, the speed of sound in air.

==== Ground roll / Rayleigh wave / Scholte wave / Surface wave ====
A Rayleigh wave typically propagates along a free surface of a solid, but the elastic constants and density of air are very low compared to those of rocks so the surface of the Earth is approximately a free surface. Low velocity, low frequency and high amplitude Rayleigh waves are frequently present on a seismic record and can obscure signal, degrading overall data quality. They are known within the industry as ‘Ground Roll’ and are an example of coherent noise that can be attenuated with a carefully designed seismic survey. The Scholte wave is similar to ground roll but occurs at the sea-floor (fluid/solid interface) and it can possibly obscure and mask deep reflections in marine seismic records. The velocity of these waves varies with wavelength, so they are said to be dispersive and the shape of the wavetrain varies with distance.

==== Refraction / Head wave / Conical wave ====
A head wave refracts at an interface, travelling along it, within the lower medium and produces oscillatory motion parallel to the interface. This motion causes a disturbance in the upper medium that is detected on the surface. The same phenomenon is utilised in seismic refraction.

==== Multiple reflection ====
An event on the seismic record that has incurred more than one reflection is called a multiple. Multiples can be either short-path (peg-leg) or long-path, depending upon whether they interfere with primary reflections or not.

Multiples from the bottom of a body of water and the air-water interface are common in marine seismic data, and are suppressed by seismic processing.

==== Cultural noise ====
Cultural noise includes noise from weather effects, planes, helicopters, electrical pylons, and ships (in the case of marine surveys), all of which can be detected by the receivers.

==== Electromagnetic noise ====
Particularly important in urban environments (i.e. power lines), it is hardly removable. Some particular sensor as microelectromechanical systems (MEMs) are used to decrease these interference when in such environments.

=== 2D versus 3D ===
The original seismic reflection method involved acquisition along a two-dimensional vertical profile through the crust, now referred to as 2D data. This approach worked well with areas of relatively simple geological structure where dips are low. However, in areas of more complex structure, the 2D technique failed to properly image the subsurface due to out of plane reflections and other artefacts. Spatial aliasing is also an issue with 2D data due to the lack of resolution between the lines. Beginning with initial experiments in the 1960s, the seismic technique explored the possibility of full three-dimensional acquisition and processing. In the late 1970s the first large 3D datasets were acquired and by the 1980s and 1990s this method became widely used.

== Applications ==
Reflection seismology is used extensively in a number of fields and its applications can be categorised into three groups, each defined by their depth of investigation:

- Near-surface applications – an application that aims to understand geology at depths of up to approximately 1 km, typically used for engineering and environmental surveys, as well as coal and mineral exploration. A more recently developed application for seismic reflection is for geothermal energy surveys, although the depth of investigation can be up to 2 km deep in this case.
- Hydrocarbon exploration – used by the hydrocarbon industry to provide a high resolution map of acoustic impedance contrasts at depths of up to 10 km within the subsurface. This can be combined with seismic attribute analysis and other exploration geophysics tools and used to help geologists build a geological model of the area of interest.
- Mineral exploration – The traditional approach to near-surface (<300 m) mineral exploration has been to employ geological mapping, geochemical analysis and the use of aerial and ground-based potential field methods, in particular for greenfield exploration, in the recent decades reflection seismic has become a valid method for exploration in hard-rock environments.
- Crustal studies – investigation into the structure and origin of the Earth's crust, through to the Moho discontinuity and beyond, at depths of up to 100 km.

A method similar to reflection seismology which uses electromagnetic instead of elastic waves, and has a smaller depth of penetration, is known as Ground-penetrating radar or GPR.

=== Hydrocarbon exploration ===
Reflection seismology, more commonly referred to as "seismic reflection" or abbreviated to "seismic" within the hydrocarbon industry, is used by petroleum geologists and geophysicists to map and interpret potential petroleum reservoirs. The size and scale of seismic surveys has increased alongside the significant increases in computer power since the late 20th century. This led the seismic industry from laboriously – and therefore rarely – acquiring small 3D surveys in the 1980s to routinely acquiring large-scale high resolution 3D surveys. The goals and basic principles have remained the same, but the methods have slightly changed over the years.

The primary environments for seismic hydrocarbon exploration are land, the transition zone and marine:

Land – The land environment covers almost every type of terrain that exists on Earth, each bringing its own logistical problems. Examples of this environment are jungle, desert, arctic tundra, forest, urban settings, mountain regions and savannah.

Transition Zone (TZ) – The transition zone is considered to be the area where the land meets the sea, presenting unique challenges because the water is too shallow for large seismic vessels but too deep for the use of traditional methods of acquisition on land. Examples of this environment are river deltas, swamps and marshes, coral reefs, beach tidal areas and the surf zone. Transition zone seismic crews will often work on land, in the transition zone and in the shallow water marine environment on a single project in order to obtain a complete map of the subsurface.

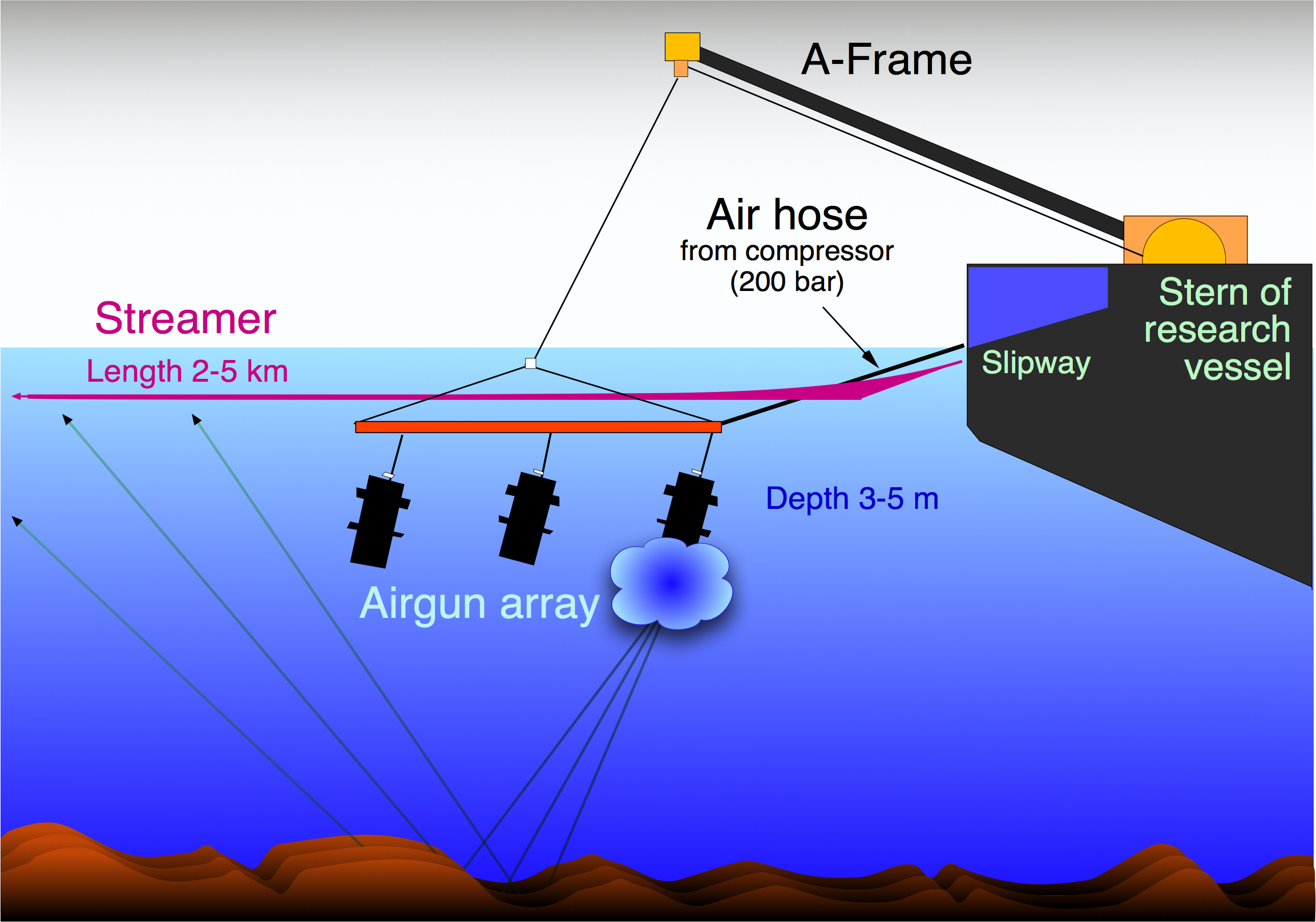
Diagram of equipment used for marine seismic surveys

Marine – The marine zone is either in shallow water areas (water depths of less than 30 to 40 metres would normally be considered shallow water areas for 3D marine seismic operations) or in the deep water areas normally associated with the seas and oceans (such as the Gulf of Mexico).

==== Seismic data acquisition ====
Seismic data acquisition is the first of the three distinct stages of seismic exploration, the other two being seismic data processing and seismic interpretation.

Seismic surveys are typically designed by National oil companies and International oil companies who hire service companies such as CGG, Petroleum Geo-Services and WesternGeco to acquire them. Another company is then hired to process the data, although this can often be the same company that acquired the survey. Finally the finished seismic volume is delivered to the oil company so that it can be geologically interpreted.

==== Land survey acquisition ====
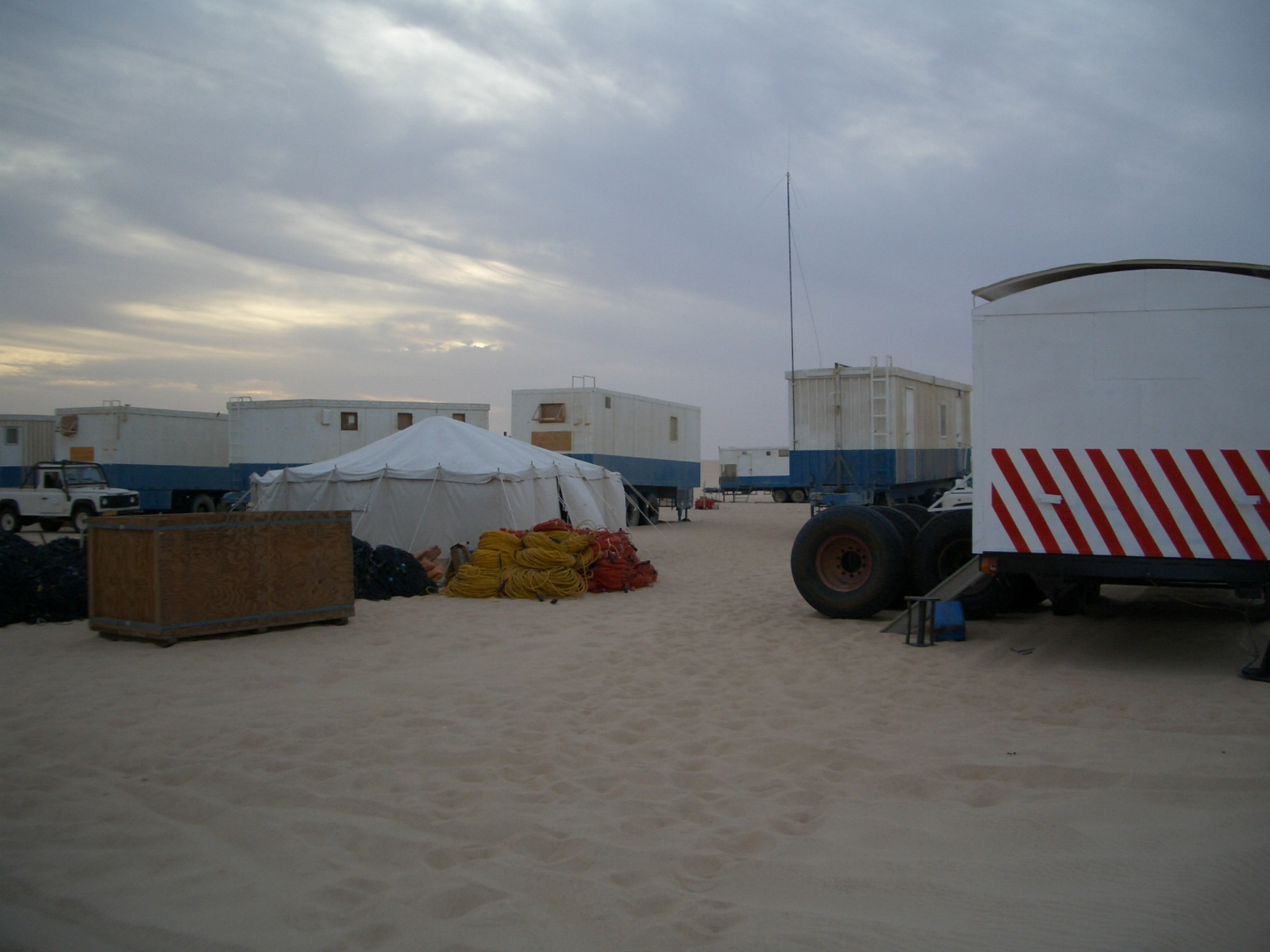
Desert land seismic camp

Receiver line on a desert land crew with recorder truck

Land seismic surveys tend to be large entities, requiring hundreds of tons of equipment and employing anywhere from a few hundred to a few thousand people, deployed over vast areas for many months. There are a number of options available for a controlled seismic source in a land survey and particularly common choices are Vibroseis and dynamite. Vibroseis is a non-impulsive source that is cheap and efficient but requires flat ground to operate on, making its use more difficult in undeveloped areas. The method comprises one or more heavy, all-terrain vehicles lowering a steel plate onto the ground, which is then vibrated with a specific frequency distribution and amplitude. It produces a low energy density, allowing it to be used in cities and other built-up areas where dynamite would cause significant damage, though the large weight attached to a Vibroseis truck can cause its own environmental damage. Dynamite is an impulsive source that is regarded as the ideal geophysical source due to it producing an almost perfect impulse function but it has obvious environmental drawbacks. For a long time, it was the only seismic source available until weight dropping was introduced around 1954, allowing geophysicists to make a trade-off between image quality and environmental damage. Compared to Vibroseis, dynamite is also operationally inefficient because each source point needs to be drilled and the dynamite placed in the hole.

Unlike in marine seismic surveys, land geometries are not limited to narrow paths of acquisition, meaning that a wide range of offsets and azimuths is usually acquired and the largest challenge is increasing the rate of acquisition. The rate of production is obviously controlled by how fast the source (Vibroseis in this case) can be fired and then move on to the next source location. Attempts have been made to use multiple seismic sources at the same time in order to increase survey efficiency and a successful example of this technique is Independent Simultaneous Sweeping (ISS).

A land seismic survey requires substantial logistical support; in addition to the day-to-day seismic operation itself, there must also be support for the main camp for resupply activities, medical support, camp and equipment maintenance tasks, security, personnel crew changes and waste management. Some operations may also operate smaller 'fly' camps that are set up remotely where the distance is too far to travel back to the main camp on a daily basis and these will also need logistical support on a frequent basis.

==== Marine survey acquisition (Towed Streamer) ====
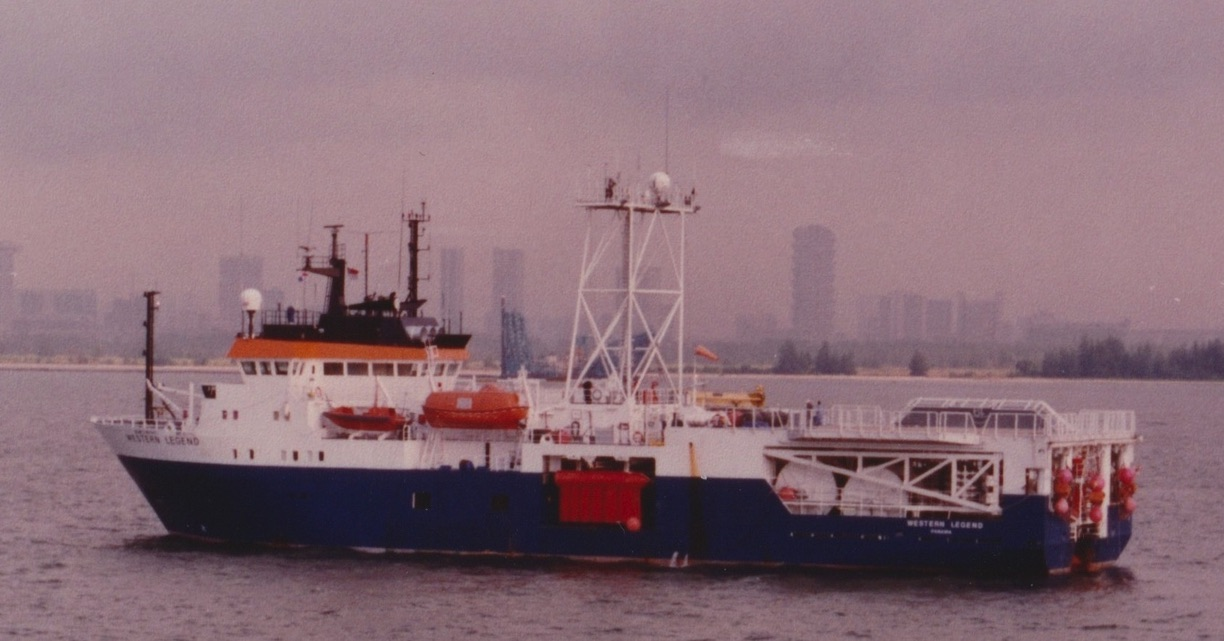
R/V Western Legend seismic survey vessel

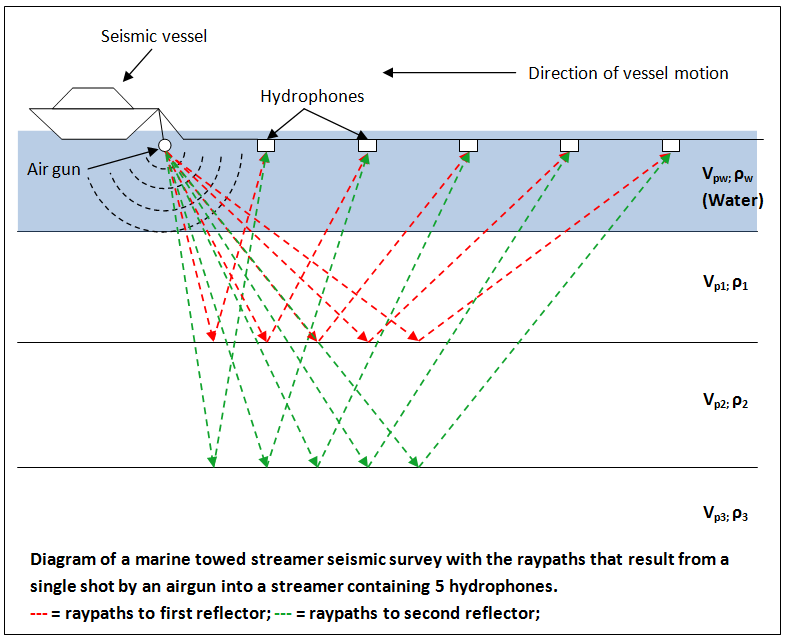
Marine seismic survey using a towed streamer

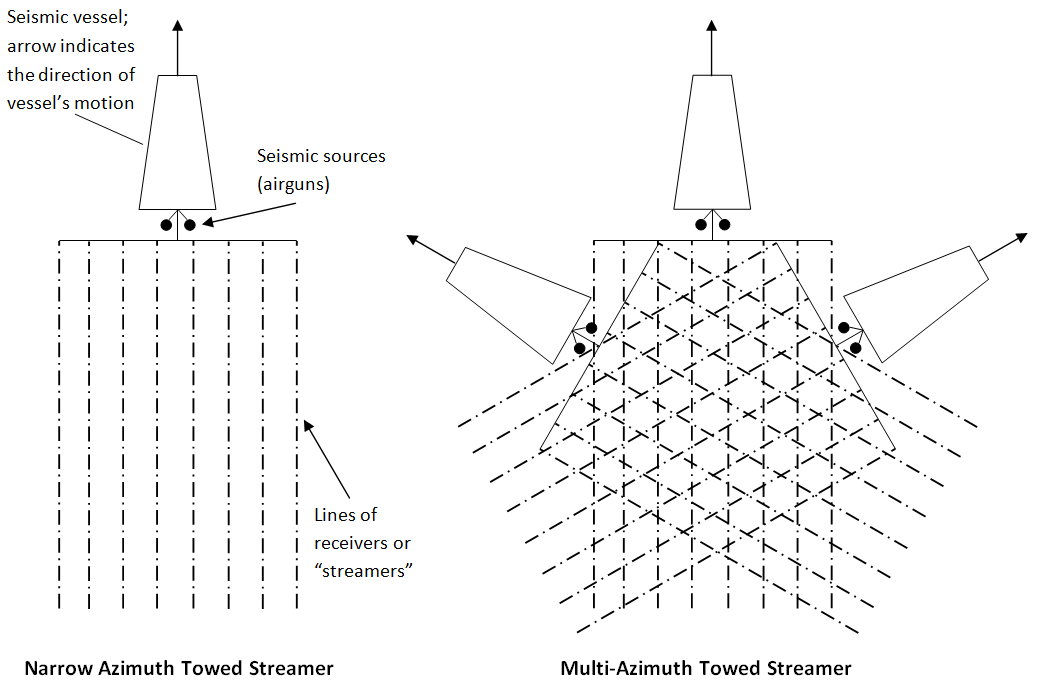
Plan view of NATS and MAZ surveys

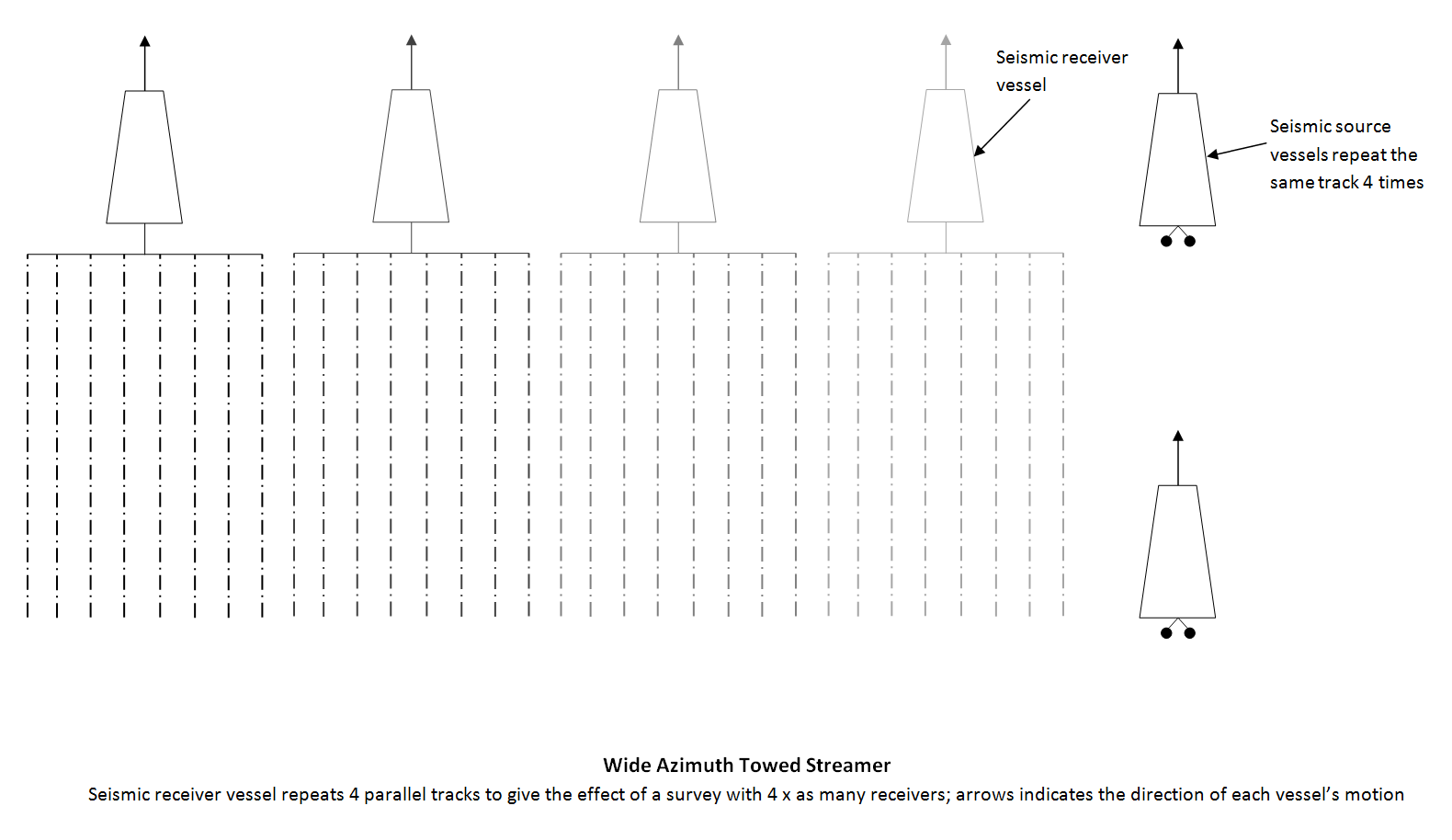
Plan view of a WATS/WAZ survey

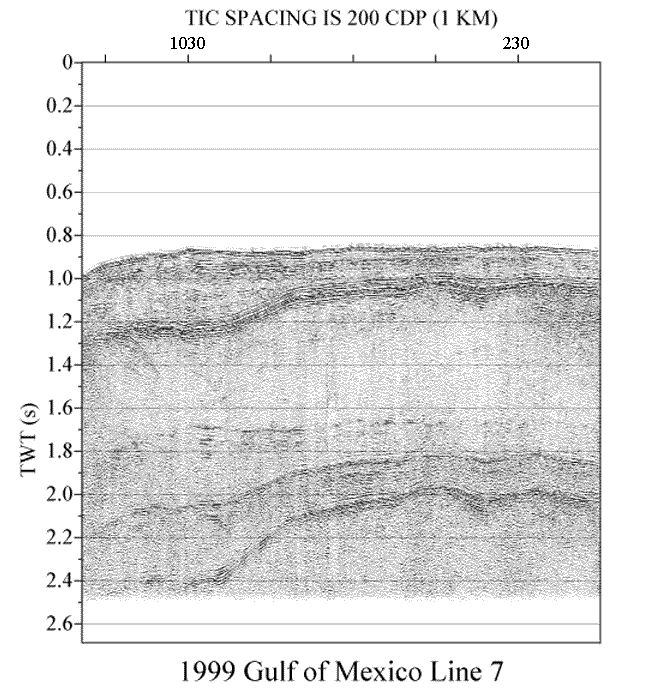
Seismic data collected by the USGS in the Gulf of Mexico

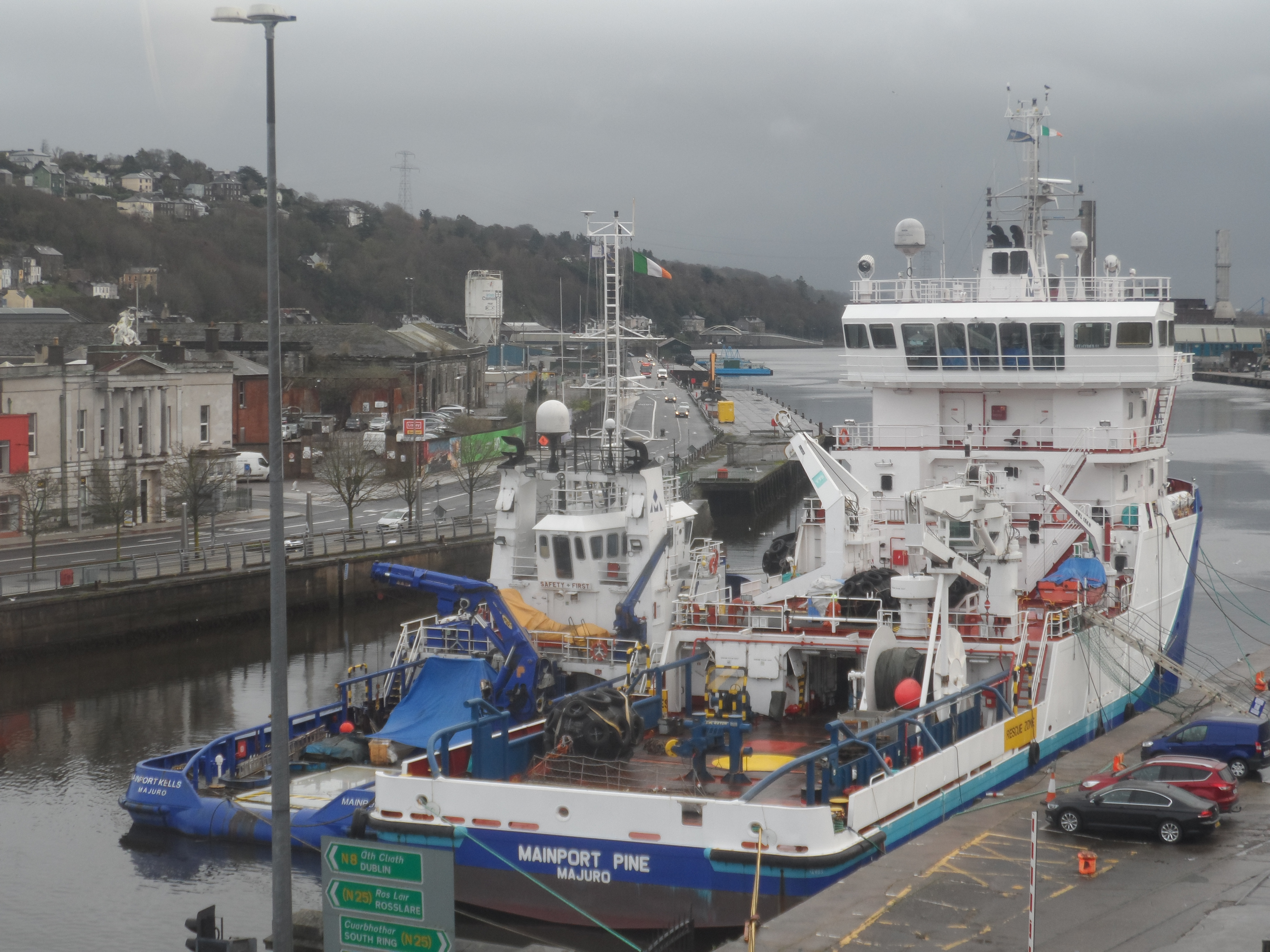
Seismic support vessel

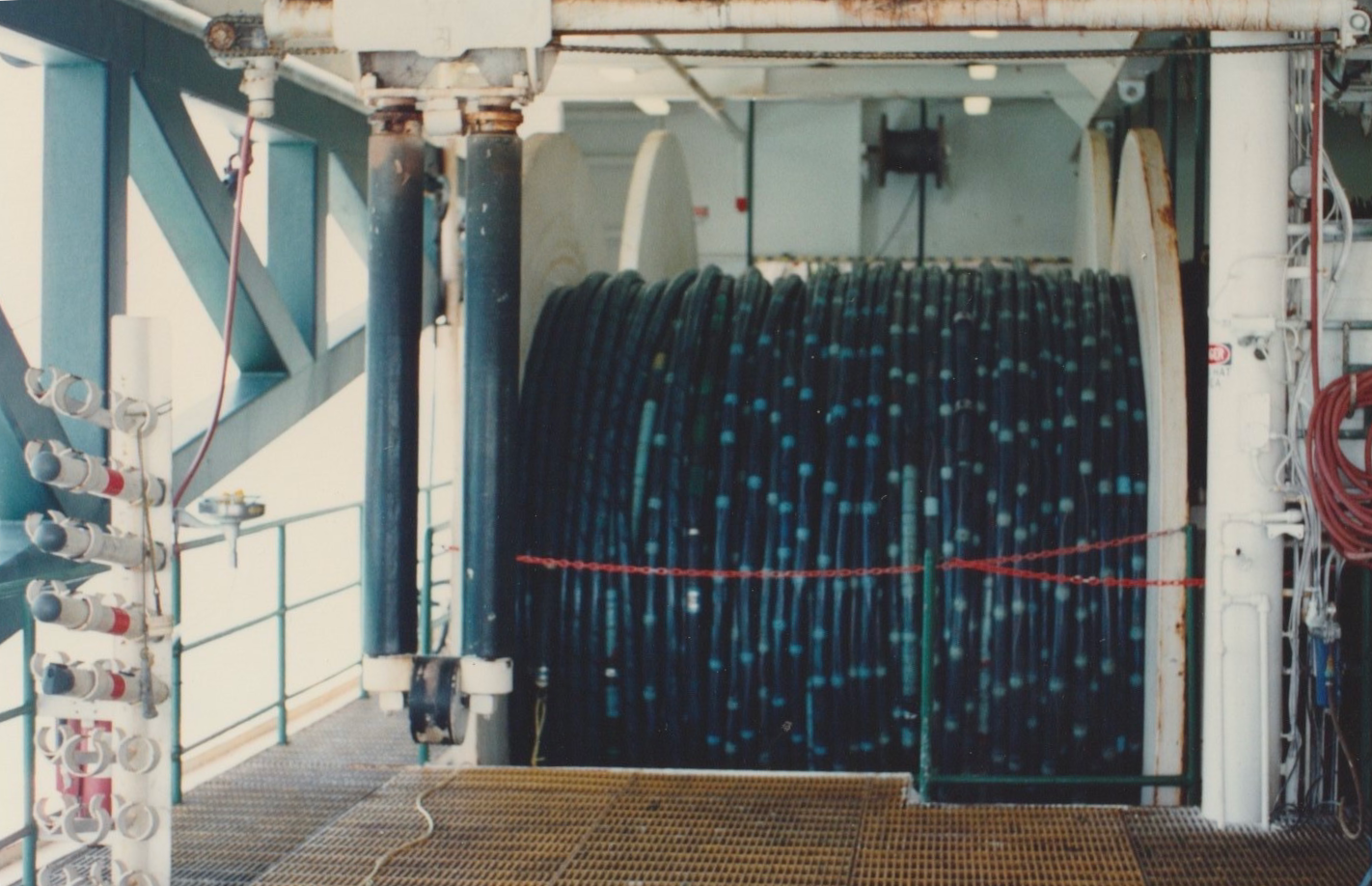
Litton 3 km marine streamer

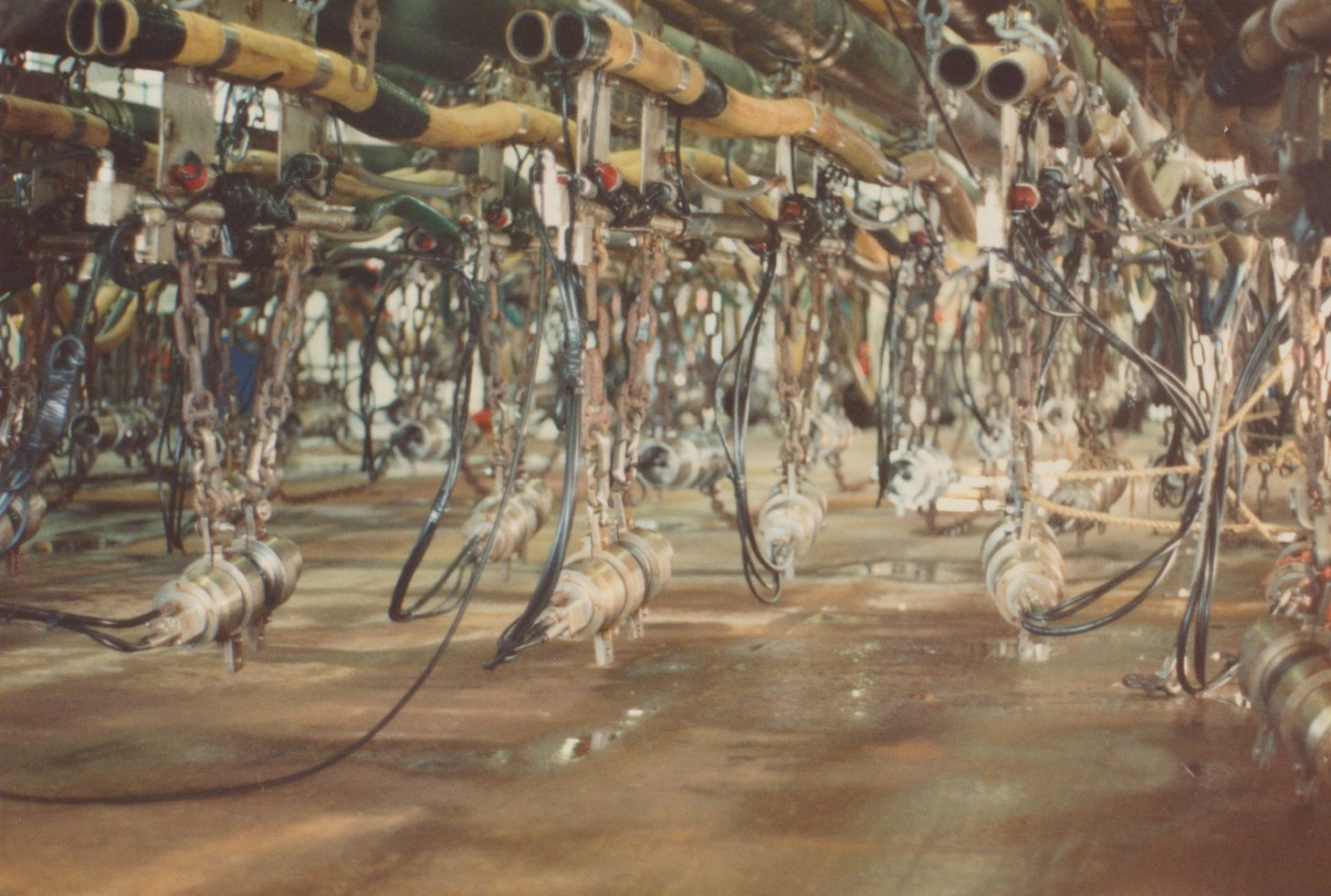
Litton LP gun strings (energy source)

Towed streamer marine seismic surveys are conducted using specialist seismic vessels that tow one or more cables known as streamers just below the surface typically between 5 and 15 metres depending upon the project specification that contain groups of hydrophones (or receiver groups) along their length (see diagram). Modern streamer vessels normally tow multiple streamers astern which can be secured to underwater wings, commonly known as doors or vanes that allow a number of streamers to be towed out wide to the port and starboard side of a vessel. Current streamer towing technology such as seen on the PGS operated Ramform series of vessels built between 2013 and 2017 has pushed the number of streamers up to 24 in total on these vessels. For vessels of this type of capacity, it is not uncommon for a streamer spread across the stern from 'door to door' to be in excess on one nautical mile. The precise configuration of the streamers on any project in terms of streamer length, streamer separation, hydrophone group length and the offset or distance between the source centre and the receivers will be dependent upon the geological area of interest below the sea floor that the client is trying to get data from.

Streamer vessels also tow high energy sources, principally high pressure air gun arrays that operate at 2000psi that fire together to the create a tuned energy pulse into the seabed from which the reflected energy waves are recorded on the streamer receiver groups. Gun arrays are tuned, that is the frequency response of the resulting air bubble from the array when fired can be changed depending upon the combination and number of guns in a specific array and their individual volumes. Guns can be located individual on an array or can be combined to form clusters. Typically, source arrays have a volume of 2000 cubic inches to 7000 cubic inches, but this will depend upon the specific geology of the survey area.

Marine seismic surveys generate a significant quantity of data due to the size of modern towed streamer vessels and their towing capabilities.

A seismic vessel with 2 sources and towing a single streamer is known as a Narrow-Azimuth Towed Streamer (or NAZ or NATS). By the early 2000s, it was accepted that this type of acquisition was useful for initial exploration but inadequate for development and production, in which wells had to be accurately positioned. This led to the development of the Multi-Azimuth Towed Streamer (MAZ) which tried to break the limitations of the linear acquisition pattern of a NATS survey by acquiring a combination of NATS surveys at different azimuths (see diagram). This successfully delivered increased illumination of the subsurface and a better signal to noise ratio.

The seismic properties of salt poses an additional problem for marine seismic surveys, it attenuates seismic waves and its structure contains overhangs that are difficult to image. This led to another variation on the NATS survey type, the wide-azimuth towed streamer (or WAZ or WATS) and was first tested on the Mad Dog field in 2004. This type of survey involved 1 vessel solely towing a set of 8 streamers and 2 separate vessels towing seismic sources that were located at the start and end of the last receiver line (see diagram). This configuration was "tiled" 4 times, with the receiver vessel moving further away from the source vessels each time and eventually creating the effect of a survey with 4 times the number of streamers. The end result was a seismic dataset with a larger range of wider azimuths, delivering a breakthrough in seismic imaging. These are now the three common types of marine towed streamer seismic surveys.

==== Marine survey acquisition (Ocean Bottom Seismic (OBS)) ====
Marine survey acquisition is not just limited to seismic vessels; it is also possible to lay cables of geophones and hydrophones on the sea bed in a similar way to how cables are used in a land seismic survey, and use a separate source vessel. This method was originally developed out of operational necessity in order to enable seismic surveys to be conducted in areas with obstructions, such as production platforms, without having the compromise the resultant image quality. Ocean bottom cables (OBC) are also extensively used in other areas that a seismic vessel cannot be used, for example in shallow marine (water depth <300m) and transition zone environments, and can be deployed by remotely operated underwater vehicles (ROVs) in deep water when repeatability is valued (see 4D, below). Conventional OBC surveys use dual-component receivers, combining a pressure sensor (hydrophone) and a vertical particle velocity sensor (vertical geophone), but more recent developments have expanded the method to use four-component sensors i.e. a hydrophone and three orthogonal geophones. Four-component sensors have the advantage of being able to also record shear waves, which do not travel through water but can still contain valuable information.

In addition to the operational advantages, OBC also has geophysical advantages over a conventional NATS survey that arise from the increased fold and wider range of azimuths associated with the survey geometry. However, much like a land survey, the wider azimuths and increased fold come at a cost and the ability for large-scale OBC surveys is severely limited.

In 2005, ocean bottom nodes (OBN) – an extension of the OBC method that uses battery-powered cableless receivers placed in deep water – was first trialled over the Atlantis Oil Field in a partnership between BP and Fairfield Geotechnologies. The placement of these nodes can be more flexible than the cables in OBC and they are easier to store and deploy due to their smaller size and lower weight.

==== Marine survey acquisition (Ocean Bottom Nodes (OBN)) ====
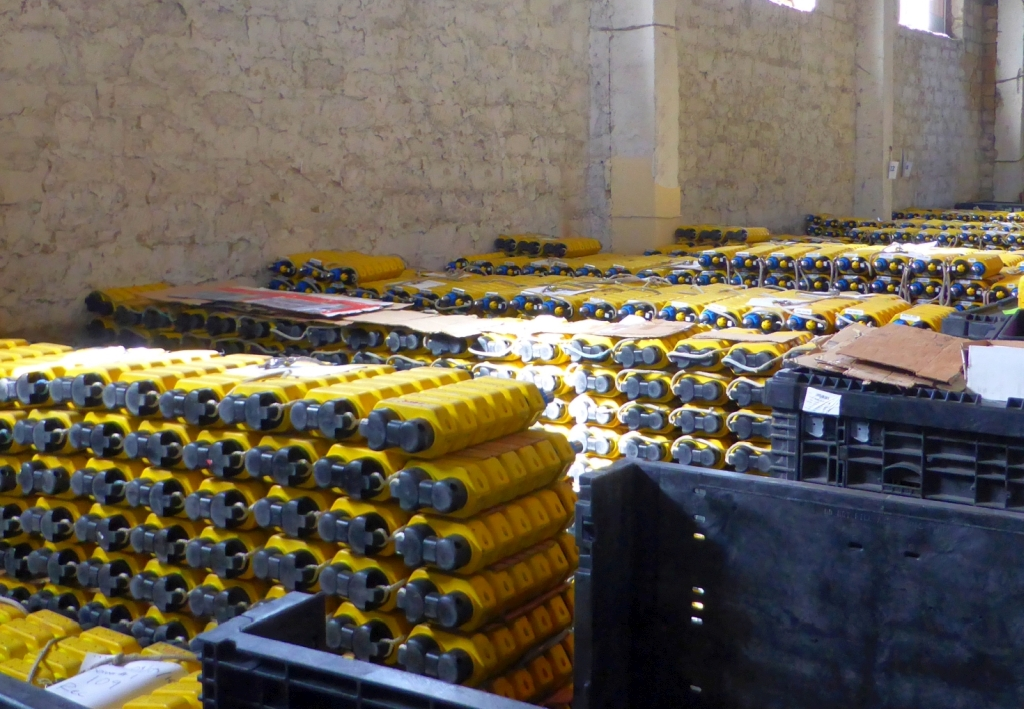
Large node surveys can create a significant requirement for secure and well serviced storage areas

The development of node technology came as a direct development from that of ocean bottom cable technology, i.e. that ability to place a hydrophone in direct contact with the seafloor to eliminate the seafloor to hydrophone sea water space that exists with towed streamer technology. The ocean bottom hydrophone concept itself is not new and has been used for many years in scientific research, but its rapid use as a data acquisition methodology in oil and gas exploration is relatively recent.

Nodes are self-contained 4-component units which include a hydrophone and three horizontal and vertical axis orientation sensors. Their physical dimensions vary depending on the design requirement and the manufacturer, but in general nodes tend to weigh in excess of 10 kilograms per unit to counteract buoyancy issues and to lessen the chance of movement on the seabed due to currents or tides.

Nodes are usable in areas where streamer vessels may not be able to safely enter and so for the safe navigation of node vessels and prior to the deployment of nodes, a bathymetry seabed survey is normally conducted of the survey area using side-scan technology to map the seabed topography in detail. This will identify any possible hazards that could impact the safe navigation of node and source vessels and also to identify any issues for node deployment including subsea obstructions, wrecks, oilfield infrastructure or sudden changes in water depths from underwater cliffs, canyons or other locations where nodes may not be stable or not make a good connection to the seabed.

Unlike OBC operations, a node vessel does not connect to a node line, whereas ocean bottom cables need to be physically attached to a recorder vessel to record data in real-time. With nodes, until the nodes are recovered and the data reaped from them (reaping is the industry term used to remove data from a recovered node when it is placed within a computerised system that copies the hard drive data from the node), there is an assumption that the data will be recorded as there is no real-time quality control element to a node's operating status as they are self-contained and not connected to any system once they are deployed. The technology is now well-established and very reliable and once a node and its battery system has passed all of its setup criteria there is a high degree of confidence that a node will work as specified. Technical downtime during node projects, i.e. individual node failures during deployment are usually in single figures as a percentage of the total nodes deployed.

Nodes are powered by either rechargeable internal Lithium-ion battery packs or replaceable non-rechargeable batteries - the design and the specification of the node will determine what battery technology is used. The battery life of a node unit is a critical consideration in the design of a node project; this is because once the battery runs out on a node, the data that has been collected is no longer stored on the solid-state hard drive and all data recorded since it was deployed on the sea floor will be lost. Therefore, a node with a 30-day battery life must be deployed, record data, be recovered and reaped within that 30-day period. This also ties in with the number of nodes that are to be deployed as this is closely related to battery life too. If too many nodes are deployed and the OBN crew's resources are not sufficient to recover these in time or external factors such as adverse weather limits recovery operations, batteries can expire and data can be lost. Disposable or non-rechargeable batteries can also create a significant waste management issue as batteries must be transported to and from an operation and the drained batteries disposed of by a licensed contractor ashore.

Another important consideration is that of synchronising the timing of individual node clock units with an internal clock drift correction. Any error in synchronising nodes properly before they are deployed can create unusable data. Because node acquisition is often multi-directional and from a number of sources simultaneously across a 24-hour time frame, for accurate data processing it is vital that all of the nodes are working to the same clock time.

The node type and specification will determine the node handling system design and the deployment and recovery modes. At present there are two mainstream approaches; node on a rope and ROV operations.

Node on a rope

This method requires the node to be attached to a steel wire or a high specification rope. Each node will be evenly spaced along the rope which will have special fittings to securely connect the node to the rope, for example every 50 metres depending upon the prospect design. This rope is then laid by a specialist node vessel using a node handling system, usually with dynamic positioning along a pre-defined node line. The nodes are ‘landed’ onto pre-plotted positions with an agreed and acceptable error radius, for example, a node must be placed within a 12.5 metre radius from the navigation pre-plot positions. They are often accompanied by pingers, small transponders that can be detected by an underwater acoustic positioning transducer which allows a pinging vessel or the node vessel itself to establish a definite sea floor position for each node on deployment. Depending on the contract, pingers can be located on every node or every third node, for example. Pinging and pinging equipment is the industry shorthand for the use of USBL or Ultra-short baseline acoustic positioning systems which are interfaced with vessel based differential GPS or Differential Global Positioning System navigation equipment.

Node lines are usually recovered by anchor or grapple hook dragging to recover the node line back on board the vessel. Handling systems on node vessels are used to store, deploy and recover nodes and their specific design will depend upon the node design. Small nodes can include a manual handling element whereas larger nodes are automatically handled by robotic systems for moving, storing, recharging and reaping nodes. Node vessels also use systems such as spoolers to manage rope lines and rope bins to store the many kilometres of ropes often carried onboard node on a rope vessels.

Node on a rope is normally used where there is shallow water within the prospect, for example less than 100 metres or a transition zone area close to a beach. For deeper water operations, a dynamic positioning vessel is used to ensure accurate deployment of nodes, but these larger vessels have a limitation as to how far into shore they can safely navigate into; the usual cutoff will be between 15 and 20 metres water depth depending on the vessel and its in-water equipment. Specialist shallow water boats can then be used for deploying and recovering nodes in water depths as shallow as 1 to 3 metres. These shallow water nodes can then be used to tie-in with geophones on the shore to provide a consistent seismic line transition from water to land.

There are some issues with this approach which make them vulnerable to damage or loss on a project and these all must be risk assessed and mitigated. Since nodes connected together on a rope sit on the sea floor unattended: they can be moved due to strong currents, the ropes can snag on seabed obstructions, they can be dragged by third party vessel anchors and caught by trawling fishing vessels. The threat of these types of potential hazards to this equipment should normally be identified and assessed during the project planning phase, especially in oilfield locations where well heads, pipelines and other subsea structures exist and where any contact with these must be avoided, normally achieved by adopting exclusion zones. Since it is possible for node lines to be moved after deployment, the issue of node position on recovery is critical and therefore positioning during both deployment and recovery is a standard navigation quality control check. In some case, node lines may need to be recovered and re-laid if the nodes have moved outside of the contract specifications.

ROV deployment

This method utilises ROV (remotely operated underwater vehicle) technology to handle and place nodes at their pre-plotted positions. This type of deployment and recovery method uses a basket full of nodes which is lowered into the water. An ROV will connect with the compatible node basket and remove individual nodes from a tray in a pre-defined order. Each node will be placed on its allocated pre-plot position. On recovery, the process works in reverse; the node to be recovered is picked up by the ROV, placed into the node basket tray until the basket is full when it is lifted back to the surface. The basket is recovered onto the node vessel, the nodes are removed from the basket and reaped.

ROV operations are normally used for deep water node projects, often in water depths to 3000 metres in the open ocean. However, there are some issues with ROV operations that need to be considered. ROV operations tend to be complex, especially deep water ROV operations and so the periodic maintenance demands may impact upon production. Umbilical's and other high technology spares for ROV's can be extremely expensive and repairs to ROVs which require onshore or third-party specialist support will stop a node project. Due to extreme water depths, the node deployment and recovery production rate will be much lower due to the time for node basket transit from surface to seafloor and there will almost certainly be weather or sea condition limitation for ROV operations in open ocean areas. The logistics for supporting operations far from shore can also be problematic for regular resupply, bunkering and crew change activities.

==== Time lapse acquisition (4D) ====
Time lapse or 4D surveys are 3D seismic surveys repeated after a period of time, the 4D term refers to the fourth dimension which in this case is time. Time lapse surveys are acquired in order to observe reservoir changes during production and identify areas where there are barriers to flow that may not be detectable in conventional seismic. Time lapse surveys consist of a baseline survey and a monitor or repeat survey, acquired after the field has been in production. Most of these surveys have been repeated NATS surveys as they are cheaper to acquire and most fields historically already had a NATS baseline survey. Some of these surveys are collected using ocean-bottom cables because the cables can be accurately placed in their previous location after being removed. Better repetition of the exact source and receiver location leads to improved repeatability and better signal to noise ratios. A number of 4D surveys have also been set up over fields in which ocean bottom cables have been purchased and permanently deployed. This method can be known as life of field seismic (LoFS) or permanent reservoir monitoring (PRM).

4D seismic surveys using towed streamer technology can be very challenging as the aim of a 4D survey it to repeat the original or baseline survey as accurately as possible. Weather, tides, current and even the time of year can have a significant impact upon how accurately such a survey can achieve that repeatability goal.

OBN has proven to be another very good way to accurately repeat a seismic acquisition. The world's first 4D survey using nodes was acquired over the Atlantis Oil Field in 2009, with the nodes being placed by a ROV in a water depth of 1300–2200 metres to within a few metres of where they were previously placed in 2005.

==== Seismic data processing ====
There are three main processes in seismic data processing: deconvolution, common-midpoint (CMP) stacking and migration.

Deconvolution is a process that tries to extract the reflectivity series of the Earth, under the assumption that a seismic trace is just the reflectivity series of the Earth convolved with distorting filters. This process improves temporal resolution by collapsing the seismic wavelet, but it is nonunique unless further information is available such as well logs, or further assumptions are made. Deconvolution operations can be cascaded, with each individual deconvolution designed to remove a particular type of distortion.

CMP stacking is a robust process that uses the fact that a particular location in the subsurface will have been sampled numerous times and at different offsets. This allows a geophysicist to construct a group of traces with a range of offsets that all sample the same subsurface location, known as a Common Midpoint Gather. The average amplitude is then calculated along a time sample, resulting in significantly lowering the random noise but also losing all valuable information about the relationship between seismic amplitude and offset. Less significant processes that are applied shortly before the CMP stack are Normal moveout correction and statics correction. Unlike marine seismic data, land seismic data has to be corrected for the elevation differences between the shot and receiver locations. This correction is in the form of a vertical time shift to a flat datum and is known as a statics correction, but will need further correcting later in the processing sequence because the velocity of the near-surface is not accurately known. This further correction is known as a residual statics correction.

Seismic migration is the process by which seismic events are geometrically re-located in either space or time to the location the event occurred in the subsurface rather than the location that it was recorded at the surface, thereby creating a more accurate image of the subsurface.

==== Seismic interpretation ====
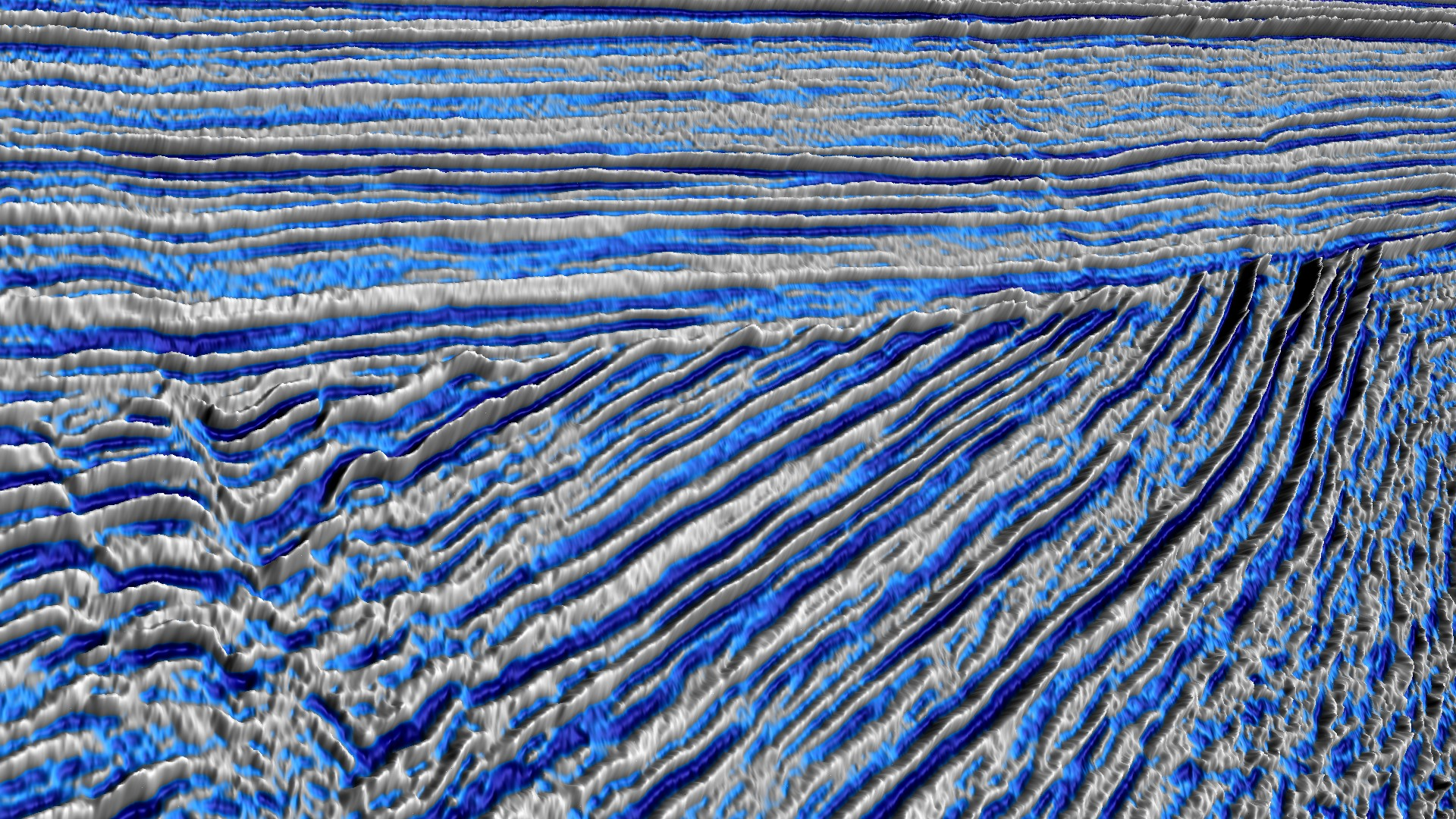

The goal of seismic interpretation is to obtain a coherent geological story from the map of processed seismic reflections. At its most simple level, seismic interpretation involves tracing and correlating along continuous reflectors throughout the 2D or 3D dataset and using these as the basis for the geological interpretation. The aim of this is to produce structural maps that reflect the spatial variation in depth of certain geological layers. Using these maps hydrocarbon traps can be identified and models of the subsurface can be created that allow volume calculations to be made. However, a seismic dataset rarely gives a picture clear enough to do this. This is mainly because of the vertical and horizontal seismic resolution but often noise and processing difficulties also result in a lower quality picture. Due to this, there is always a degree of uncertainty in a seismic interpretation and a particular dataset could have more than one solution that fits the data. In such a case, more data will be needed to constrain the solution, for example in the form of further seismic acquisition, borehole logging or gravity and magnetic survey data. Similarly to the mentality of a seismic processor, a seismic interpreter is generally encouraged to be optimistic in order encourage further work rather than the abandonment of the survey area. Seismic interpretation is completed by both geologists and geophysicists, with most seismic interpreters having an understanding of both fields.

In hydrocarbon exploration, the features that the interpreter is particularly trying to delineate are the parts that make up a petroleum reservoir – the source rock, the reservoir rock, the seal and trap.

==== Seismic attribute analysis ====
Seismic attribute analysis involves extracting or deriving a quantity from seismic data that can be analysed in order to enhance information that might be more subtle in a traditional seismic image, leading to a better geological or geophysical interpretation of the data. Examples of attributes that can be analysed include mean amplitude, which can lead to the delineation of bright spots and dim spots, coherency and amplitude versus offset. Attributes that can show the presence of hydrocarbons are called direct hydrocarbon indicators.

=== Crustal studies ===
The use of reflection seismology in studies of tectonics and the Earth's crust was pioneered in the 1970s by groups such as the Consortium for Continental Reflection Profiling (COCORP), who inspired deep seismic exploration in other countries such as BIRPS in Great Britain and ECORS in France. The British Institutions Reflection Profiling Syndicate (BIRPS) was started up as a result of oil hydrocarbon exploration in the North Sea. It became clear that there was a lack of understanding of the tectonic processes that had formed the geological structures and sedimentary basins which were being explored. The effort produced some significant results and showed that it is possible to profile features such as thrust faults that penetrate through the crust to the upper mantle with marine seismic surveys.

== Environmental impact ==
As with all human activities, seismic reflection surveys have some impact on the Earth's natural environment and both the hydrocarbon industry and environmental groups partake in research to investigate these effects.

=== Land ===
On land, conducting a seismic survey may require the building of roads, for transporting equipment and personnel, and vegetation may need to be cleared for the deployment of equipment. If the survey is in a relatively undeveloped area, significant habitat disturbance may occur and many governments require seismic companies to follow strict rules regarding destruction of the environment; for example, the use of dynamite as a seismic source may be disallowed. Seismic processing techniques allow for seismic lines to deviate around natural obstacles, or use pre-existing non-straight tracks and trails. With careful planning, this can greatly reduce the environmental impact of a land seismic survey. The more recent use of inertial navigation instruments for land survey instead of theodolites decreased the impact of seismic by allowing the winding of survey lines between trees.

The potential impact of any seismic survey on land needs to be assessed at the planning stage and managed effectively. Well regulated environments would generally require environmental and social impact assessment (ESIA) or environmental impact assessment (EIA) reports prior to any work starting. Project planning also needs to recognise that once a project has completed, what impact if any, will be left behind. It is the contractors and clients responsibility to manage the remediation plan as per the contract and as per the laws where the project has been conducted.

Depending upon the size of a project, land seismic operations can have a significant local impact and a sizeable physical footprint, especially where storage facilities, camp utilities, waste management facilities (including black and grey water management), general and seismic vehicle parking areas, workshops and maintenance facilities and living accommodation are required. Contact with local people can cause potential disruptions to their normal lives such as increased noise, 24-hour operations and increased traffic and these have to be assessed and mitigated.

Archeological considerations are also important and project planning must accommodate legal, cultural and social requirements that will have to be considered. Specialist techniques can be used to assessed safe working distances from buildings and archeological structures to minimise their impact and prevent damage.

=== Marine ===
The main environmental concern for marine seismic surveys is the potential for noise associated with the high-energy seismic source to disturb or injure animal life, especially cetaceans such as whales, porpoises, and dolphins, as these mammals use sound as their primary method of communication with one another. High-level and long-duration sound can cause physical damage, such as hearing loss, whereas lower-level noise can cause temporary threshold shifts in hearing, obscuring sounds that are vital to marine life, or behavioural disturbance.

A study has shown that migrating humpback whales will leave a minimum 3 km gap between themselves and an operating seismic vessel, with resting humpback whale pods with cows exhibiting increased sensitivity and leaving an increased gap of 7–12 km. Conversely, the study found that male humpback whales were attracted to a single operating airgun as they were believed to have confused the low-frequency sound with that of whale breaching behaviour. In addition to whales, sea turtles, fish and squid all showed alarm and avoidance behaviour in the presence of an approaching seismic source. It is difficult to compare reports on the effects of seismic survey noise on marine life because methods and units are often inadequately documented.

The gray whale will avoid its regular migratory and feeding grounds by >30 km in areas of seismic testing. Similarly the breathing of gray whales was shown to be more rapid, indicating discomfort and panic in the whale. It is circumstantial evidence such as this that has led researchers to believe that avoidance and panic might be responsible for increased whale beachings although research is ongoing into these questions.

Even so, airguns are shut down only when cetaceans are seen at very close range, usually under 1 km

Offering another point of view, a joint paper from the International Association of Geophysical Contractors (IAGC) and the International Association of Oil and Gas Producers (IOGP) argue that the noise created by marine seismic surveys is comparable to natural sources of seismic noise, stating:

The UK government organisation, the Joint Nature Conservation Committee (more commonly known as JNCC) is "...the public body that advises the UK Government and devolved administrations on UK-wide and international nature conservation." has had a long term vested interest in the impact of geophysical or seismic surveys on the marine environment for many years. Even back in the 1990s, it was understood at a government level that the impact of the sound energy produced by seismic surveys needed to be investigated and monitored. JNCC guidelines have been and continue to be one of the references used internationally as a possible baseline standard for surveys in seismic contracts world-wide, such as the 'JNCC guidelines for minimising the risk of injury to marine mammals from geophysical surveys (seismic survey guidelines)', 2017.

A complicating factor in the discussion of seismic sound energy as a disruptive factor to marine mammals is that of the size and scale of seismic surveys as they are conducted into the 21st century. Historically, seismic surveys tended to have a duration of weeks or months and to be localised, but with OBN technology, surveys can cover thousands of square kilometres of ocean and can continue for years, all of the time putting sound energy into the ocean 24 hours a day from multiple energy sources. One current example of this is the 85,000 square kilometre mega seismic survey contract signed by the Abu Dhabi national oil company ADNOC in 2018 with an estimated duration into 2024 across a range of deep-water areas, coastal areas, islands and shallow water locations. It may be very difficult to assess the long-term impact of these huge operations on marine life.

In 2017, IOGP recommended that, to avoid disturbance whilst surveying:

- Protective measures are employed to address site-specific environmental conditions of each operation to ensure that sound exposure and vessel traffic do not harm marine mammals.
- Surveys planned to avoid known sensitive areas and time periods, such as breeding and feeding areas.
- Exclusion zones are typically established around the seismic source to further protect marine fauna from any potentially detrimental effects of sound. The exclusion zone is typically a circle with a radius of at least 500 meters around the sound source.
- Trained observers and listening devices are used to visually and acoustically monitor that zone for marine mammals and other protected species before any sound-producing operations begin. These observers help ensure adherence to the protective practices during operations and their detailed reports provide information on the biodiversity of the survey area to the local governments.
- Sound production typically begins with a “soft-start” or “ramp-up” that involves a gradual increase of the sound level from the air gun source from a very low level to full operational levels at the beginning of the seismic lines – usually over 20 to 40 minutes. This soft-start procedure is intended to allow time for any animal that may be close to the sound source to move away as the sound grows louder.

As second factor is the regulatory environment where the seismic survey is taking place. In highly regulated locations such as the North Sea or the Gulf of Mexico, the legal requirements will be clearly stated at the contract level and both contractor and client will comply with the regulations as the consequences of non-compliance can be severe such as substantial fines or withdrawal of permits for exploration blocks. However, there are some countries which have a varied and rich marine biome but where the environmental laws are weak and where a regulator is ineffective or even non-existent. This situation, where the regulatory framework is not robust can severely compromise any attempts at protecting marine environments: this is frequently found where state-owned oil and gas companies are dominant in a country and where the regulator is also a state-owned and operated entity and therefore it is not considered to be truly independent.

== See also ==
- Deconvolution
- Depth conversion, the conversion of acoustic waves two-way travel time to actual depth
- Exploration geophysics
- LIGO
- Passive seismic
- SEG-Y, a popular file format for seismic reflection data
- Seismic migration
- Seismic refraction
- Seismic Unix, open source software for processing of seismic reflection data
- Seismic wave
- Seismic wide-angle reflection and refraction
- Swell filter
- Synthetic seismogram
