= Mechanical wave =

Wave which is an oscillation of matter

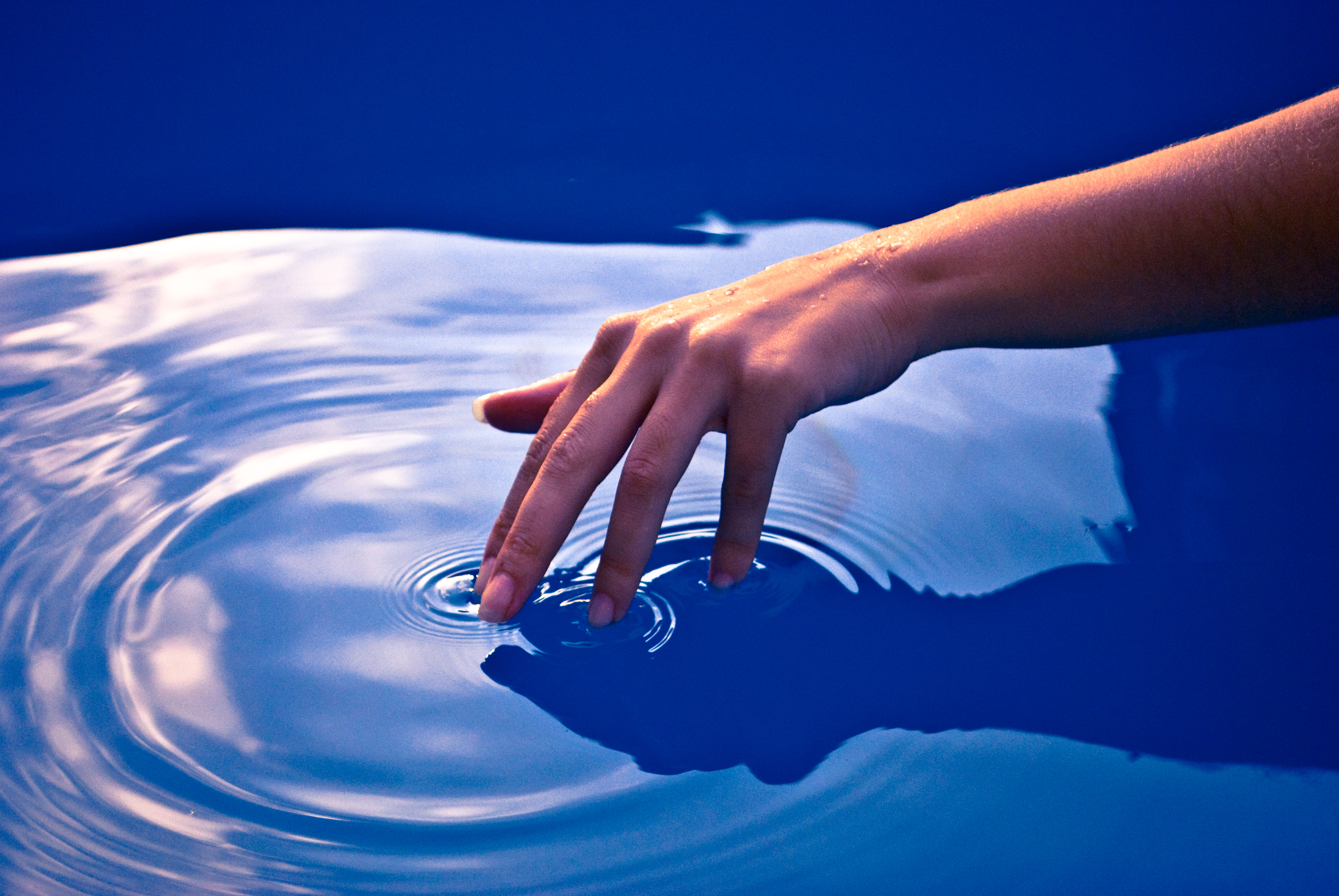
A ripple in water is a surface wave.

In classical mechanics, a mechanical wave is a wave that is an oscillation of matter, and therefore transfers energy through an elastic material medium. Vacuum is, from classical perspective, a non-material medium, where electromagnetic waves propagate.

While waves can move over long distances, the movement of the medium of transmission—the material—is limited. Therefore, the oscillating material does not move far from its initial equilibrium position. Mechanical waves can be produced only in media which possess elasticity and inertia. There are three types of mechanical waves: transverse waves, longitudinal waves, and surface waves. Some of the most common examples of mechanical waves are water waves, sound waves, and seismic waves.

Like all waves, mechanical waves transport energy. This energy propagates in the same direction as the wave. A wave requires an initial energy input. Once this initial energy is added, the wave travels through the medium until all its energy is transferred. In contrast, electromagnetic waves require no medium, but can still travel through one.

== Transverse wave ==
A transverse wave is the form of a wave in which particles of medium vibrate about their mean position perpendicular to the direction of the motion of the wave.

== Longitudinal wave ==
Longitudinal waves cause the medium to vibrate parallel to the direction of the wave. It consists of multiple compressions and rarefactions. The rarefaction is the furthest distance apart in the longitudinal wave and the compression is the closest distance together. The speed of the longitudinal wave is increased in higher index of refraction, due to the closer proximity of the atoms in the medium that is being compressed. Sound is an example of a longitudinal wave.

== Surface waves ==
This type of wave travels along the surface or interface between two media. An example of a surface wave would be waves in a pool, or in an ocean, lake, or any other type of water body. There are two types of surface waves, namely Rayleigh waves and Love waves.

Rayleigh waves, also known as ground roll, are waves that travel as ripples with motion similar to waves on the surface of water. Such waves are much slower than body waves, at roughly 90% of the velocity of bulk waves for a typical homogeneous elastic medium. Rayleigh waves have energy losses only in two dimensions and are hence more destructive in earthquakes than conventional bulk waves, such as P-waves and S-waves, which lose energy in all three directions.

A Love wave is a surface wave having horizontal waves that are shear or transverse to the direction of propagation. They usually travel slightly faster than Rayleigh waves, at about 90% of the body wave velocity, and have the largest amplitude.

== Examples ==
- Seismic waves
- Sound waves
- Wind waves on seas and lakes
- Vibration

== See also ==
- Acoustics
- Ultrasound
- Underwater acoustics
