= Surface wave =

Physical phenomenon

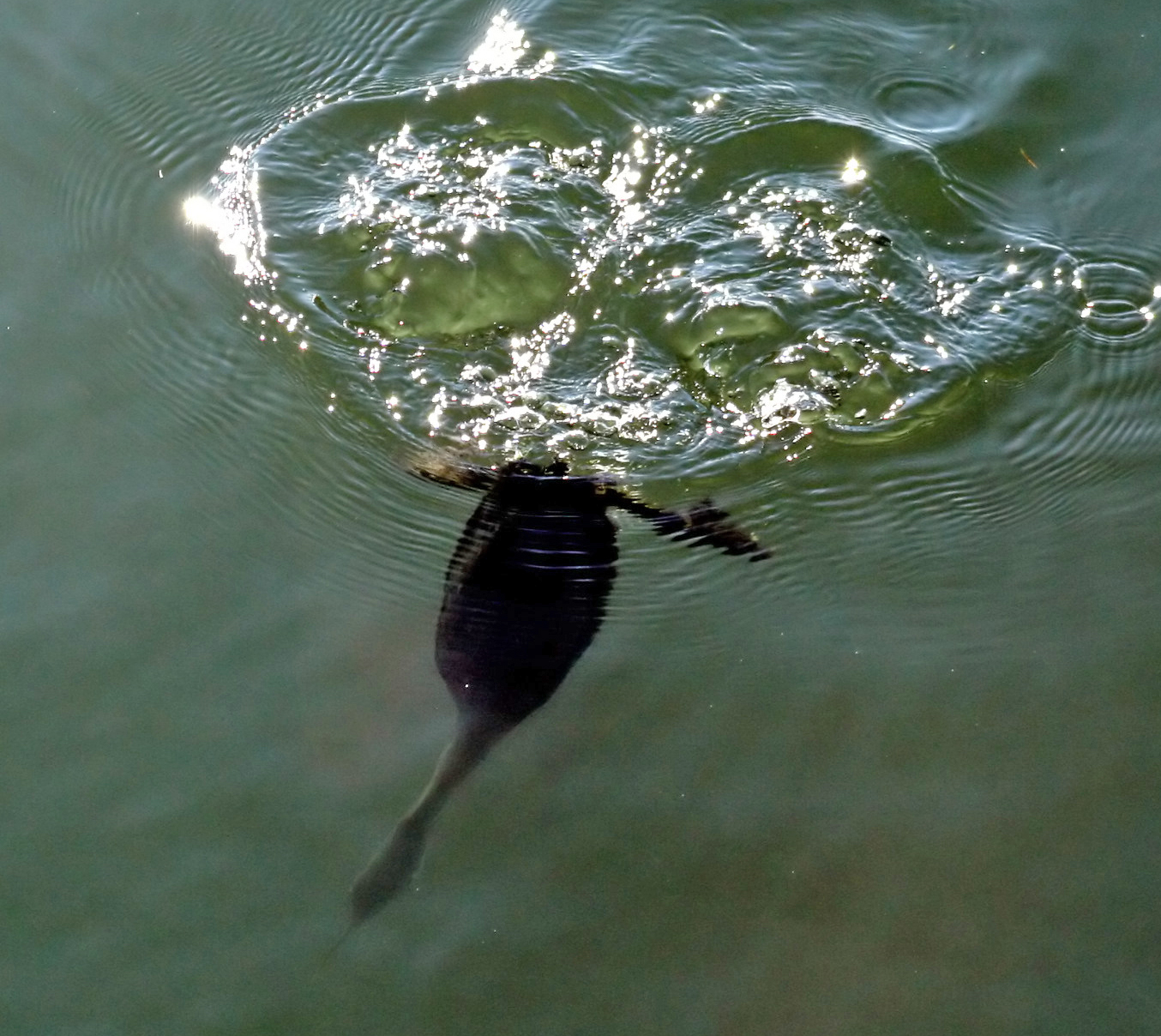
A diving grebe creating surface waves

In physics, a surface wave is a mechanical wave that propagates along the interface between differing media. A common example is gravity waves along the surface of liquids, such as ocean waves. Gravity waves can also occur within liquids, at the interface between two fluids with different densities. Elastic surface waves can travel along the surface of solids, such as Rayleigh or Love waves. Electromagnetic waves can also propagate as "surface waves" in that they can be guided along with a refractive index gradient or along an interface between two media having different dielectric constants. In radio transmission, a ground wave is a guided wave that propagates close to the surface of the Earth.

== Mechanical waves ==
In seismology, several types of surface waves are encountered. Surface waves, in this mechanical sense, are commonly known as either Love waves (L waves) or Rayleigh waves. A seismic wave is a wave that travels through the Earth, often as the result of an earthquake or explosion. Love waves have transverse motion (movement is perpendicular to the direction of travel, like light waves), whereas Rayleigh waves have both longitudinal (movement parallel to the direction of travel, like sound waves) and transverse motion. Seismic waves are studied by seismologists and measured by a seismograph or seismometer. Surface waves span a wide frequency range, and the period of waves that are most damaging is usually 10 seconds or longer. Surface waves can travel around the globe many times from the largest earthquakes. Surface waves are caused when P waves and S waves come to the surface.

Examples are the waves at the surface of water and air (ocean surface waves). Another example is internal waves, which can be transmitted along the interface of two water masses of different densities.

In theory of hearing physiology, the traveling wave (TW) of Von Bekesy, resulted from an acoustic surface wave of the basilar membrane into the cochlear duct. His theory purported to explain every feature of the auditory sensation owing to these passive mechanical phenomena. Later David Kemp, showed that that is unrealistic and that active feedback is necessary. Finally, in 2025 A. James Hudspeth and his research team – based on "a groundbreaking technological advancement" – established that also in mammals frequency analysis in the inner ear occurs without a traveling wave on the basilar membrane, and the inner ear theory of Georg von Békésy was thus disproved. Instead, this new finding is in agreement with a function of the traveling wave as an overload protection of the cochlea by absorption of excessive sound input.

== Electromagnetic waves ==
Ground waves are radio waves propagating parallel to and adjacent to the surface of the Earth, following the curvature of the Earth. This radiative ground wave is known as Norton surface wave, or more properly Norton ground wave, because ground waves in radio propagation are not confined to the surface.

Another type of surface wave is the non-radiative, bound-mode Zenneck surface wave or Zenneck–Sommerfeld surface wave. The earth has one refractive index and the atmosphere has another, thus constituting an interface that supports the guided Zenneck wave's transmission. Other types of surface wave are the trapped surface wave, the gliding wave and Dyakonov surface waves (DSW) propagating at the interface of transparent materials with different symmetry. Apart from these, various types of surface waves have been studied for optical wavelengths.

=== Microwave field theory ===
Within microwave field theory, the interface of a dielectric and conductor supports "surface wave transmission". Surface waves have been studied as part of transmission lines and some may be considered as single-wire transmission lines.

Characteristics and utilizations of the electrical surface wave phenomenon include:

- The field components of the wave diminish with distance from the interface.
- Electromagnetic energy is not converted from the surface wave field to another form of energy (except in leaky or lossy surface waves) such that the wave does not transmit power normal to the interface, i.e. it is evanescent along that dimension.
- In coaxial cable in addition to the TEM mode there also exists a transverse-magnetic (TM) mode which propagates as a surface wave in the region around the central conductor. For coax of common impedance this mode is effectively suppressed but in high impedance coax and on a single central conductor without any outer shield, low attenuation and very broadband propagation is supported. Transmission line operation in this mode is called E-Line.

=== Surface plasmon polariton ===
The E-field of a surface plasmon polariton at a silver–air interface, at a frequency corresponding to a free-space wavelength of 10μm. At this frequency, the silver behaves approximately as a perfect electric conductor, and the SPP is called a Sommerfeld–Zenneck wave, with almost the same wavelength as the free-space wavelength.

The surface plasmon polariton (SPP) is an electromagnetic surface wave that can travel along an interface between two media with different dielectric constants. It exists under the condition that the permittivity of one of the materials forming the interface is negative, while the other one is positive, as is the case for the interface between air and a lossy conducting medium below the plasma frequency. The wave propagates parallel to the interface and decays exponentially vertical to it, a property called evanescence. Since the wave is on the boundary of a lossy conductor and a second medium, these oscillations can be sensitive to changes to the boundary, such as the adsorption of molecules by the conducting surface.

=== Sommerfeld–Zenneck surface wave ===
The Sommerfeld–Zenneck wave or Zenneck wave is a non-radiative guided electromagnetic wave that is supported by a planar or spherical interface between two homogeneous media having different dielectric constants. This surface wave propagates parallel to the interface and decays exponentially vertical to it, a property known as evanescence. It exists under the condition that the permittivity of one of the materials forming the interface is negative, while the other one is positive, as for example the interface between air and a lossy conducting medium such as the terrestrial transmission line, below the plasma frequency. Its electric field strength falls off at a rate of e^{-αd}/√d in the direction of propagation along the interface due to two-dimensional geometrical field spreading at a rate of 1/√d, in combination with a frequency-dependent exponential attenuation (α), which is the terrestrial transmission line dissipation, where α depends on the medium's conductivity. Arising from original analysis by Arnold Sommerfeld and Jonathan Zenneck of the problem of wave propagation over a lossy earth, it exists as an exact solution to Maxwell's equations. The Zenneck surface wave, which is a non-radiating guided-wave mode, can be derived by employing the Hankel transform of a radial ground current associated with a realistic terrestrial Zenneck surface wave source. Sommerfeld-Zenneck surface waves predict that the energy decays as R^{−1} because the energy distributes over the circumference of a circle and not the surface of a sphere. Evidence does not show that in radio space wave propagation, Sommerfeld-Zenneck surfaces waves are a mode of propagation as the path-loss exponent is generally between 20 dB/dec and 40 dB/dec.

== See also ==
- Seismic waves
- Seismic communication
- P-waves
- S-waves
- Surface acoustic wave
- Sky waves, the primary means of HF transmission
- Surface plasmon, a longitudinal charge density wave along the interface of conducting and dielectric mediums
- Surface-wave-sustained mode, a propagation of electromagnetic surface waves.
- Evanescent waves and evanescent wave coupling
- Ocean surface waves, internal waves and crests, dispersion, and freak waves
- Lateral wave
- Love wave and Rayleigh–Lamb wave
- Gravity waves, occurs at certain natural interfaces (e.g. the atmosphere and ocean)
- Stoneley wave
- Scholte wave
- Dyakonov surface wave

People

- Arnold Sommerfeld – published a mathematical treatise on the Zenneck wave
- Jonathan Zenneck – Pupil of Sommerfeld; Wireless pioneer; developed the Zenneck wave
- John Stone Stone – Wireless pioneer; produced theories on radio propagation

Other

- Ground constants, the electrical parameters of earth
- Near and far field, the radiated field that is within one quarter of a wavelength of the diffracting edge or the antenna and beyond.
- Skin effect, the tendency of an alternating electric current to distribute itself within a conductor so that the current density near the surface of the conductor is greater than that at its core.
- Surface wave inversion
- Green's function, a function used to solve inhomogeneous differential equations subject to boundary conditions.
