= Ground vibrations =

Technical term for mostly man-made phenomena

Ground vibrations is a technical term that is being used to describe mostly man-made vibrations of the ground, in contrast to natural vibrations of the Earth studied by seismology. For example, vibrations caused by explosions, construction works, railway and road transport, etc. - all belong to ground vibrations.

== General information ==
Ground vibrations are associated with different types of elastic waves propagating through the ground. These are surface waves, mostly Rayleigh waves, and bulk longitudinal waves and transverse waves (or shear waves) propagating into the ground depth. Typical frequency range for environmental ground vibrations is 1 – 200 Hz. Waves of lower frequencies (below 1 Hz) are usually called microseisms, and they are normally associated with natural phenomenae, e.g. water waves in the oceans. Environmental ground vibrations generated by rail and road traffic may cause annoyance to residents of nearby buildings both directly and via generated structure-borne interior noise. Very strong ground vibrations, e.g. generated by heavy lorries on bumped roads, may even cause structural damage to very close buildings. Magnitudes of ground vibrations are usually described in terms of particle vibration velocity (in mm/s or m/s). Sometimes they are also described in decibels (relative to the reference particle velocity of 10^{−9} m/s). Typical values of ground vibration particle velocity associated with vehicles passing over traffic calming road humps are in the range of 0.1 – 2 mm/s. Magnitudes of ground vibrations that are considered to be able to cause structural damage to buildings are above 10–20 mm/s.

== Ground vibrations from railways ==
The main sources of ground vibrations generated by railway trains are dynamic forces transmitted from tracks to the ground. These forces are associated with complex processes of interaction of moving train axles with railway tracks supported by the elastic ground. The magnitudes of these forces generally increase with the increase of train speeds. Therefore, the levels of generated ground vibrations may be substantial in the case of high-speed trains. If a train speed becomes larger than Rayleigh wave velocity in the ground, an additional very large increase in generated ground vibrations takes place. This phenomenon is termed ground vibration boom, and it is similar to sonic boom generated by supersonic aircraft.

== Ground vibrations from road traffic ==
The main mechanism responsible for generation of ground vibrations by moving cars and lorries is the dynamic forces associated with vehicle passage over road irregularities, such as bumps, peats, etc. These forces, and hence generated ground vibrations, can be reduced by keeping road surfaces in good condition.

== Ground vibrations at construction ==
The main sources of ground vibrations at construction are pile driving, dynamic compaction, blasting, and operation of heavy construction equipment. These vibrations may harmfully affect surrounding buildings, and their effect ranges from disturbance of residents to visible structural damage.

== See also ==
- Love wave
- Shear wave
