= Shadow zone =

Area not reached by seismic waves from an earthquake

Seismic shadow zone (from USGS)

A seismic shadow zone is an area of the Earth's surface where seismographs cannot detect direct P waves and/or S waves from an earthquake. This is due to liquid layers or structures within the Earth's surface. The most recognized shadow zone is due to the core-mantle boundary where P waves are refracted and S waves are stopped at the liquid outer core; however, any liquid boundary or body can create a shadow zone. For example, magma reservoirs with a high enough percent melt can create seismic shadow zones.

== Background ==
The earth is made up of different structures: the crust, the mantle, the inner core and the outer core. The crust, mantle, and inner core are typically solid; however, the outer core is entirely liquid. A liquid outer core was first shown in 1906 by Geologist Richard Oldham. Oldham observed seismograms from various earthquakes and saw that some seismic stations did not record direct S waves, particularly ones that were 120° away from the hypocenter of the earthquake.

In 1913, Beno Gutenberg noticed the abrupt change in seismic velocities of the P waves and disappearance of S waves at the core-mantle boundary. Gutenberg attributed this due to a solid mantle and liquid outer core, calling it the Gutenberg discontinuity.

== Seismic wave properties ==
The main observational constraint on identifying liquid layers and/or structures within the earth come from seismology. When an earthquake occurs, seismic waves radiate out spherically from the earthquake's hypocenter. Two types of body waves travel through the Earth: primary seismic waves (P waves) and secondary seismic waves (S waves). P waves travel with motion in the same direction as the wave propagates and S waves travel with motion perpendicular to the wave propagation (transverse).

The P waves are refracted by the liquid outer core of the Earth and are not detected between 104° and 140° (between approximately 11,570 and 15,570 km or 7,190 and 9,670 mi) from the hypocenter. This is due to Snell's law, where a seismic wave encounters a boundary and either refracts or reflects. In this case, the P waves refract due to density differences and greatly reduce in velocity. This is considered the P wave shadow zone.

The S waves cannot pass through the liquid outer core and are not detected more than 104° (approximately 11,570 km or 7,190 mi) from the epicenter. This is considered the S wave shadow zone. However, P waves that travel refract through the outer core and refract to another P wave (PKP wave) on leaving the outer core can be detected within the shadow zone. Additionally, S waves that refract to P waves on entering the outer core and then refract to an S wave on leaving the outer core can also be detected in the shadow zone (SKS waves).

The reason for this is P wave and S wave velocities are governed by different properties in the material which they travel through and the different mathematical relationships they share in each case. The three properties are: incompressibility ($k$), density ($p$) and rigidity ($u$).

P wave velocity is equal to:

$\sqrt{(k+\tfrac{4}{3}u)/p}$

S wave velocity is equal to:

$\sqrt{u/p}$

S wave velocity is entirely dependent on the rigidity of the material it travels through. Liquids have zero rigidity, making the S wave velocity zero when traveling through a liquid. Overall, S waves are shear waves, and shear stress is a type of deformation that cannot occur in a liquid. Conversely, P waves are compressional waves and are only partially dependent on rigidity. P waves still maintain some velocity (can be greatly reduced) when traveling through a liquid.

== Other observations and implications ==
Although the core-mantle boundary casts the largest shadow zone, smaller structures, such as magma bodies, can also cast a shadow zone. For example, in 1981, Páll Einarsson conducted a seismic investigation on the Krafla Caldera in Northeast Iceland. In this study, Einarsson placed a dense array of seismometers over the caldera and recorded earthquakes that occurred. The resulting seismograms showed both an absence of S waves and/or small S wave amplitudes. Einarsson attributed these results to be caused by a magma reservoir. In this case, the magma reservoir has enough percent melt to cause S waves to be directly affected. In areas where there are no S waves being recorded, the S waves are encountering enough liquid, that no solid grains are touching. In areas where there are highly attenuated (small aptitude) S waves, there is still a percentage of melt, but enough solid grains are touching where S waves can travel through the part of the magma reservoir.

Between 2014 and 2018, a geophysicist in Taiwan, Cheng-Horng Lin investigated the magma reservoir beneath the Tatun Volcanic Group in Taiwan. Lin's research group used deep earthquakes and seismometers on or near the Tatun Volcanic Group to identify changes P and S waveforms. Their results showed P wave delays and the absence of S waves in various locations. Lin attributed this finding to be due to a magma reservoir with at least 40% melt that casts an S wave shadow zone. However, a recent study done by National Chung Cheng University used a dense array of seismometers and only saw S wave attenuation associated with the magma reservoir. This research study investigated the cause of the S wave shadow zone Lin observed and attributed it to either a magma diapir above the subducting Philippine Sea plate. Though it was not a magma reservoir, there was still a structure with enough melt/liquid to cause an S wave shadow zone.

The existence of shadow zones, more specifically S wave shadow zones, could have implications on the eruptibility of volcanoes throughout the world. When volcanoes have enough percent melt to go below the rheological lockup (percent crystal fraction when a volcano is eruptive or not eruptive), this makes the volcanoes eruptible. Determining the percent melt of a volcano could help with predictive modeling and assess current and future hazards. In an actively erupting volcano, Mt. Etna in Italy, a study was done in 2021 that showed both an absence of S waves in some regions and highly attenuated S waves in others, depending on where the receivers are located above the magma chamber. Previously, in 2014, a study was done to model the mechanism leading to December 28, 2014, eruption. This study showed that an eruption could be triggered between 30 and 70% melt.

== See also ==
- Seismic wave
- Ray tracing (physics)
- P wave
- S wave
- Snell's Law
- Structure of Earth
- Core-mantle boundary
