= SKS (disambiguation) =

The SKS is a Russian semi-automatic rifle.

SKS may also refer to:

- SKS Microfinance, India
- SKS, formerly Signature Kitchen Suite, a luxury home appliance brand owned by LG
- SKS wave, a seismic wave
- SKS Starogard Gdański, a Polish basketball team
- SKS365, an Austrian bookmaker
- SK Slavia Prague, a Czech football club
- Saks Incorporated, US company, NYSE code
- Salten Kraftsamband, a Norwegian power company
- Savez komunista Srbije, a Serbian party
- Shan King (South) stop, a Light Rail stop in Hong Kong (MTR station code)
- Sistem Kenderaan Seremban - Kuala Lumpur, a Malaysian transport company
- Someone Knows Something, podcast by David Ridgen
- Stocksfield railway station, England
- Student Committee of Solidarity, Studencki Komitet Solidarności (SKS), Poland
- Student Union in Sundsvall, Studentkåren i Sundsvall, Sweden
- Shanghai Korean School, China
- Finnish Literature Society or Suomalaisen Kirjallisuuden Seura
- Finnish People's Blue-Whites (Finnish: Suomen Kansan Sinivalkoiset), a political party
- National Socialists of Finland (Finnish: Suomen Kansallissosialistit), a political party
- Vojens Airport, Denmark (by IATA code)
- Synchronizing Key Server, a federated OpenPGP store of cryptographic keys
