= SKS wave =

An SKS wave is a type of seismic wave, with the three letters denoting the type of wave-motion through the mantle and outer core. The first S indicates that the wave travels as a shear or S wave through the mantle, the K shows that the wave travels as a compressional or P wave through the outer core, and the final S indicates an S wave, returning through the mantle. As shear waves cannot be transmitted through the liquid Outer core, some of the S wave energy is converted to P wave energy as the wave hits the core–mantle boundary. When the wave again hits the core-mantle boundary as it leaves the core, some energy is converted back to shear energy before the wave travels through the mantle. SKS waves can be observed by seismometers roughly 60-141° from an earthquake according to the preliminary reference Earth model.
