= Scholte wave =

A Scholte wave is a surface wave (interface wave) propagating at an interface between a fluid and an elastic solid medium (such as an interface between water and sand). The wave is of maximum intensity at the interface and decreases exponentially away from the interface into both the fluid and the solid medium. It is named after J. G. Scholte, who discovered it in 1947. This wave is similar to a Stoneley wave, which propagates at a solid-solid interface, and a Rayleigh wave, which propagates at a vacuum-solid interface.
