= Ground roll =

Ground roll may refer to:

- In aviation, see takeoff
- For the surface waves during an earthquake, see Rayleigh wave
