= Radio wave =

Type of electromagnetic radiation

Animation of a half-wave dipole antenna radiating radio waves, showing the electric field lines. The antenna in the center is two vertical metal rods connected to a radio transmitter (not shown). The transmitter applies an alternating electric current to the rods, which charges them alternately positive (+) and negative (−). Loops of electric field leave the antenna and travel away at the speed of light; these are the radio waves. In this animation the action is shown slowed down tremendously.

Radio waves (formerly called Hertzian waves) are a type of electromagnetic radiation with the lowest frequencies and the longest wavelengths in the electromagnetic spectrum, typically with frequencies below 300 gigahertz (GHz) and wavelengths greater than 1 millimeter (3/64 inch), about the diameter of a grain of rice. Electromagnetic (EM) waves with frequencies above about 1 GHz and wavelengths shorter than 30 centimeters are called microwaves. Like all electromagnetic waves, radio waves in a vacuum travel at the speed of light, and in the Earth's atmosphere at a slightly lower speed. Radio waves are generated by charged particles undergoing acceleration, such as time-varying electric currents. Naturally occurring radio waves are emitted by lightning and astronomical objects, and are part of the blackbody radiation emitted by all warm objects.

Radio waves are generated artificially by an electronic device called a transmitter, which is connected to an antenna, which radiates the waves. They are received by another antenna connected to a radio receiver, which processes the received signal. Radio waves are very commonly used in modern technology for fixed and mobile radio communication, broadcasting, radar and radio navigation systems, communications satellites, wireless computer networks, and many other applications. Different frequencies of radio waves have different propagation characteristics in the Earth's atmosphere; long waves can diffract around obstacles like mountains and follow the contour of the Earth (ground waves), shorter waves can reflect off the ionosphere and return to Earth beyond the horizon (skywaves), while much shorter wavelengths bend or diffract very little and travel on a line of sight, so their propagation distances are limited to the visual horizon.

To prevent interference between different users, the artificial generation and use of radio waves is strictly regulated by law, coordinated by an international body called the International Telecommunication Union (ITU), which defines radio waves as "electromagnetic waves of frequencies arbitrarily lower than 3000 GHz, propagated in space without artificial guide". The radio spectrum is divided into a number of radio bands on the basis of frequency, allocated to different uses. Higher-frequency, shorter-wavelength radio waves are called microwaves.

Diagram of the electric fields (E) and magnetic fields (H) of radio waves emitted by a monopole radio transmitting antenna (small dark vertical line in the center). The E and H fields are perpendicular, as implied by the phase diagram in the lower right.

== Discovery and exploitation ==
Radio waves were first predicted by the theory of electromagnetism that was proposed in 1867 by Scottish mathematical physicist James Clerk Maxwell. His mathematical theory, now called Maxwell's equations, predicted that a coupled electric and magnetic field could travel through space as an "electromagnetic wave". Maxwell proposed that light consisted of electromagnetic waves of very short wavelength. In 1887, German physicist Heinrich Hertz demonstrated the reality of Maxwell's electromagnetic waves by experimentally generating electromagnetic waves lower in frequency than light, radio waves, in his laboratory, showing that they exhibited the same wave properties as light: standing waves, refraction, diffraction, and polarization. Italian inventor Guglielmo Marconi developed the first practical radio transmitters and receivers around 1894–1895. He received the 1909 Nobel Prize in Physics for his radio work. Radio communication began to be used commercially around 1900. The modern term "radio wave" replaced the original name "Hertzian wave" around 1912.

== Generation and reception ==
Animated diagram of a half-wave dipole antenna receiving a radio wave. The antenna consists of two metal rods connected to a receiver R. The electric field (E, green arrows) of the incoming wave results in oscillation of the electrons in the rods, charging the ends alternately positive (+) and negative (−). Since the length of the antenna is one half the wavelength of the wave, the oscillating field induces standing waves of voltage (V, represented by red band) and current in the rods. The oscillating currents (black arrows) flow down the transmission line and through the receiver (represented by the resistance R).

Radio waves are radiated by charged particles when they are accelerated. Natural sources of radio waves include radio noise produced by lightning and other natural processes in the Earth's atmosphere, and astronomical radio sources in space such as the Sun, galaxies and nebulae. All warm objects radiate high frequency radio waves (microwaves) as part of their black body radiation.

Radio waves are produced artificially by time-varying electric currents, consisting of electrons flowing back and forth in a specially shaped metal conductor called an antenna. An electronic device called a radio transmitter applies oscillating electric current to the antenna, and the antenna radiates the power as radio waves. Radio waves are received by another antenna attached to a radio receiver. When radio waves strike the receiving antenna they push the electrons in the metal back and forth, creating tiny oscillating currents which are detected by the receiver.

From quantum mechanics, like other electromagnetic radiation such as light, radio waves can alternatively be regarded as streams of uncharged elementary particles called photons. In an antenna transmitting radio waves, the electrons in the antenna emit the energy in discrete packets called radio photons, while in a receiving antenna the electrons absorb the energy as radio photons. An antenna is a coherent emitter of photons, like a laser, so the radio photons are all in phase. However, from Planck's relation $E = h\nu$, the energy of individual radio photons is extremely small, from 10^{−22} to 10^{−30} joules. So the antenna of even a very low power transmitter emits an enormous number of photons every second. Therefore, except for certain molecular electron transition processes such as atoms in a maser emitting microwave photons, radio wave emission and absorption is usually regarded as a continuous classical process, governed by Maxwell's equations.

== Properties ==
Radio waves in a vacuum travel at the speed of light $c$. When passing through a material medium, they are slowed depending on the medium's permeability and permittivity. Air is tenuous enough that in the Earth's atmosphere radio waves travel at very nearly the speed of light.

The wavelength $\lambda$ is the distance from one peak (crest) of the wave's electric field to the next, and is inversely proportional to the frequency $f$ of the wave. The relation of frequency and wavelength in a radio wave traveling in vacuum or air is

$$\lambda = \frac{\;c \;}{f}~,$$

where

$$c \approx 2.9979 \times 10^8 \text{ m/s}$$

is the speed of light in vacuum. Equivalently, $c$, the distance that a radio wave travels in vacuum in one second, is 299,792,458 meters (983,571,056 ft), which is the wavelength of a 1 hertz radio signal. A 1 megahertz radio wave (mid-AM band) has a wavelength of 299.79 meters (983.6 ft).

=== Polarization ===
Like other electromagnetic waves, a radio wave has a property called polarization, which is defined as the direction of the wave's oscillating electric field perpendicular to the direction of motion. A plane-polarized radio wave has an electric field that oscillates in a plane perpendicular to the direction of motion. In a horizontally polarized radio wave, the electric field oscillates in a horizontal direction. In a vertically polarized wave, the electric field oscillates in a vertical direction. In a circularly polarized wave, the electric field at any point rotates about the direction of travel, once per cycle. A right circularly polarized wave rotates in a right-hand sense about the direction of travel, while a left circularly polarized wave rotates in the opposite sense. The wave's magnetic field is perpendicular to the electric field, and the electric and magnetic field are oriented in a right-hand sense with respect to the direction of radiation.

An antenna emits polarized radio waves, with the polarization determined by the direction of the metal antenna elements. For example, a dipole antenna consists of two collinear metal rods. If the rods are horizontal, it radiates horizontally polarized radio waves, while if the rods are vertical, it radiates vertically polarized waves. An antenna receiving the radio waves must have the same polarization as the transmitting antenna, or it will suffer a severe loss of reception. Many natural sources of radio waves, such as the sun, other stars, and blackbody radiation from warm objects, emit unpolarized waves, consisting of incoherent short wave trains in an equal mixture of polarization states.

The polarization of radio waves is determined by a quantum mechanical property of the photons called their spin. A photon can have one of two possible values of spin; it can spin in a right-hand sense about its direction of motion, or in a left-hand sense. Right circularly polarized radio waves consist of photons spinning in a right hand sense. Left circularly polarized radio waves consist of photons spinning in a left hand sense. Plane polarized radio waves consist of photons in a quantum superposition of right and left hand spin states. The electric field consists of a superposition of right and left rotating fields, resulting in a plane oscillation.

== Propagation characteristics ==
Radio waves are more widely used for communication than other electromagnetic waves mainly because of their desirable propagation properties, stemming from their large wavelength. Radio waves have the ability to pass through the atmosphere in any weather, foliage, and through most building materials. By diffraction, longer wavelengths can bend around obstructions, and unlike other electromagnetic waves they tend to be scattered rather than absorbed by objects larger than their wavelength.

The study of radio propagation, how radio waves move in free space and over the surface of the Earth, is vitally important in the design of practical radio systems. Radio waves passing through different environments experience reflection, refraction, polarization, diffraction, and absorption. Different frequencies experience different combinations of these phenomena in the Earth's atmosphere, making certain radio bands more useful for specific purposes than others. Practical radio systems mainly use three different techniques of radio propagation to communicate:

- Line of sight: This refers to radio waves that travel in a straight line from the transmitting antenna to the receiving antenna. It does not necessarily require a cleared sight path; at lower frequencies radio waves can pass through buildings, foliage and other obstructions. This is the only method of propagation possible at frequencies above 30 MHz. On the surface of the Earth, line of sight propagation is limited by the visual horizon to about 64 km (40 mi). This is the method used by cell phones, FM, television broadcasting and radar. By using dish antennas to transmit beams of microwaves, point-to-point microwave relay links transmit telephone and television signals over long distances up to the visual horizon. Ground stations can communicate with satellites and spacecraft billions of miles from Earth.
  - Indirect propagation: Radio waves can reach points beyond the line-of-sight by diffraction and reflection. Diffraction causes radio waves to bend around obstructions such as a building edge, a vehicle, or a turn in a hall. Radio waves also partially reflect from surfaces such as walls, floors, ceilings, vehicles and the ground. These propagation methods occur in short range radio communication systems such as cell phones, cordless phones, walkie-talkies, and wireless networks. A drawback of this mode is multipath propagation, in which radio waves travel from the transmitting to the receiving antenna via multiple paths. The waves interfere, often causing fading and other reception problems.
- Ground waves: At lower frequencies below 2 MHz, in the medium wave and longwave bands, due to diffraction vertically polarized radio waves can bend over hills and mountains, and propagate beyond the horizon, traveling as surface waves which follow the contour of the Earth. This makes it possible for mediumwave and longwave broadcasting stations to have coverage areas beyond the horizon, out to hundreds of miles. Ground waves are gradually absorbed by the Earth, so the power density of the waves decreases exponentially with distance from the transmitting antenna, limiting the range of reception. As the frequency drops, the losses decrease and the achievable range increases. Military very low frequency (VLF) and extremely low frequency (ELF) communication systems can communicate over most of the Earth. VLF and ELF radio waves can also penetrate water to hundreds of meters deep, so they are used to communicate with submerged submarines.
- Skywaves: At medium wave and shortwave wavelengths, radio waves reflect off conductive layers of charged particles (ions) in a part of the atmosphere called the ionosphere. So radio waves directed at an angle into the sky can return to Earth beyond the horizon; this is called "skip" or "skywave" propagation. By using multiple skips communication at intercontinental distances can be achieved. Skywave propagation is variable and dependent on atmospheric conditions; it is most reliable at night and in the winter. Widely used during the first half of the 20th century, due to its unreliability skywave communication has mostly been abandoned. Remaining uses are by military over-the-horizon (OTH) radar systems, by some automated systems, by radio amateurs, and by shortwave broadcasting stations to broadcast to other countries.

At microwave frequencies, atmospheric gases begin absorbing radio waves, so the range of practical radio communication systems decreases with increasing frequency. Below about 20 GHz atmospheric attenuation is mainly due to water vapor. Above 20 GHz, in the millimeter wave band, other atmospheric gases begin to absorb the waves, limiting practical transmission distances to a kilometer or less. Above 300 GHz, in the terahertz band, virtually all the power is absorbed within a few meters, so the atmosphere is effectively opaque.

== Radio communication ==
In radio communication systems, information is transported across space using radio waves. At the sending end, the information to be sent, in the form of a time-varying electrical signal, is applied to a radio transmitter. The information, called the modulation signal, can be an audio signal representing sound from a microphone, a video signal representing moving images from a video camera, or a digital signal representing data from a computer. In the transmitter, an electronic oscillator generates an alternating current oscillating at a radio frequency, called the carrier wave because it creates the radio waves that "carry" the information through the air. The information signal is used to modulate the carrier, altering some aspect of it, encoding the information on the carrier. The modulated carrier is amplified and applied to an antenna. The oscillating current pushes the electrons in the antenna back and forth, creating oscillating electric and magnetic fields, which radiate the energy away from the antenna as radio waves. The radio waves carry the information to the receiver location.

At the receiver, the oscillating electric and magnetic fields of the incoming radio wave push the electrons in the receiving antenna back and forth, creating a tiny oscillating voltage which is a weaker replica of the current in the transmitting antenna. This voltage is applied to the radio receiver, which extracts the information signal. The receiver first uses a bandpass filter to separate the desired radio station's radio signal from all the other radio signals picked up by the antenna, then amplifies the signal so it is stronger, then finally extracts the information-bearing modulation signal in a demodulator. The recovered signal is sent to a loudspeaker or earphone to produce sound, or a television display screen to produce a visible image, or other devices. A digital data signal is applied to a computer or microprocessor, which interacts with a human user.

The radio waves from many transmitters pass through the air simultaneously without interfering with each other. They can be separated in the receiver because each transmitter's radio waves oscillate at a different rate, in other words each transmitter has a different frequency, measured in kilohertz (kHz), megahertz (MHz) or gigahertz (GHz). The bandpass filter in the receiver consists of one or more tuned circuits which act like a resonator, similarly to a tuning fork. The tuned circuit has a natural resonant frequency at which it oscillates. The resonant frequency is set equal to the frequency of the desired radio station. The oscillating radio signal from the desired station causes the tuned circuit to oscillate in sympathy, and it passes the signal on to the rest of the receiver. Radio signals at other frequencies are blocked by the tuned circuit and not passed on.

== Biological and environmental effects ==
Radio waves are non-ionizing radiation, which means they do not have enough energy to separate electrons from atoms or molecules, ionizing them, or break chemical bonds, causing chemical reactions or DNA damage. The main effect of absorption of radio waves by materials is to heat them, similarly to the infrared waves radiated by sources of heat such as a space heater or wood fire. The oscillating electric field of the wave causes polar molecules to vibrate back and forth, increasing the temperature; this is how a microwave oven cooks food. Radio waves have been applied to the body for 100 years in the medical therapy of diathermy for deep heating of body tissue, to promote increased blood flow and healing. More recently they have been used to create higher temperatures in hyperthermia therapy and to kill cancer cells.

However, unlike infrared waves, which are mainly absorbed at the surface of objects and cause surface heating, radio waves are able to penetrate the surface and deposit their energy inside materials and biological tissues. The depth to which radio waves penetrate decreases with their frequency, and also depends on the material's resistivity and permittivity; it is given by a parameter called the skin depth of the material, which is the depth within which 63% of the energy is deposited. For example, the 2.45 GHz radio waves (microwaves) in a microwave oven penetrate most foods approximately 2.5 to 3.8 cm.

Radio waves symbol

Looking into a source of radio waves at close range, such as the waveguide of a working radio transmitter, can cause damage to the lens of the eye by heating. A strong enough beam of radio waves can penetrate the eye and heat the lens enough to cause cataracts.

Since the heating effect is in principle no different from other sources of heat, most research into possible health hazards of exposure to radio waves has focused on "nonthermal" effects; whether radio waves have any effect on tissues besides that caused by heating. Radiofrequency electromagnetic fields have been classified by the International Agency for Research on Cancer (IARC) as having "limited evidence" for its effects on humans and other animals. There is weak mechanistic evidence of cancer risk via personal exposure to RF-EMF from mobile telephones.

Radio waves can be shielded against by a conductive metal sheet or screen, an enclosure of sheet or screen is called a Faraday cage. A metal screen shields against radio waves as well as a solid sheet as long as the holes in the screen are smaller than about 1/20 of wavelength of the waves.

== Measurement ==
Since radio frequency radiation has both an electric and a magnetic component, it is often convenient to express intensity of radiation field in terms of units specific to each component. The unit volt per meter (V/m) is used for the electric component, and the unit ampere per meter (A/m) is used for the magnetic component. One can speak of an electromagnetic field, and these units are used to provide information about the levels of electric and magnetic field strength at a measurement location.

Another commonly used unit for characterizing an RF electromagnetic field is power density. Power density is most accurately used when the point of measurement is far enough away from the RF emitter to be located in what is referred to as the far field zone of the radiation pattern. In closer proximity to the transmitter, i.e., in the "near field" zone, the physical relationships between the electric and magnetic components of the field can be complex, and it is best to use the field strength units discussed above. Power density is measured in terms of power per unit area, for example, with the unit milliwatt per square centimeter (mW/cm^{2}). When speaking of frequencies in the microwave range and higher, power density is usually used to express intensity since exposures that might occur would likely be in the far field zone.

== See also ==
- Radio astronomy
- Television transmitter
