= Michael S. Longuet-Higgins =

British Mathematician

- Born: 8 December 1925; Lenham, England
- Died: 26 February 2016 (aged 90); Cambridge, England
- Citizenship: United Kingdom
- Education: Trinity College, Cambridge; Winchester College
- Known for: Microseisms; Fluid Dynamics; Rhombo blocks; Longuet-Higgins Point; Longuet-Higgins Circle
- Awards: Rayleigh Prize for Mathematics (1950); Fellow of the Royal Society (1963); National Academy of Sciences (1979); American Geophysical Union (1981); Sverdrup Gold Medal (1983); International Coastal Engineering Award (1984); Oceanography Award (1990); Acoustical Society of America (2002)
- Scientific career
- Fields: Mathematics; Fluid Dynamics; Oceanography
- Workplaces: Cambridge University; National Institute of Oceanography; University of California, San Diego; Scripps Institution of Oceanography
- Doctoral advisors: Harold Jeffreys; Robert Stoneley

Michael Selwyn Longuet-Higgins FRS (8 December 1925 – 26 February 2016) was a British mathematician and oceanographer at the Department of Applied Mathematics and Theoretical Physics (DAMTP), Cambridge University, England and Institute for Nonlinear Science, University of California, San Diego, USA. He was the younger brother of H. Christopher Longuet-Higgins.

Longuet-Higgins introduced the theory of the origin of microseisms and is the inventor of "rhombo blocks", a mathematical toy consisting of blocks whose faces are rhombuses.

Educated at The Pilgrims' School, Winchester and Winchester College from 1937 to 1941 with Freeman Dyson, his brother Christopher and James Lighthill from 1937 to 1943, he won a mathematics scholarship to Trinity College, Cambridge at the age of 17, where he graduated with a BA in mathematics in 1945 after only two years. He was awarded a doctorate in geophysics in 1951. From 1969 to 1989 he was a Royal Society Research Fellow at the University of Cambridge.

His research areas included both pure mathematics (projective geometry, polytopes, random functions and surfaces) and applied mathematics (fluid dynamics, microseisms, the generation of ocean waves by wind, the dynamics of liquid bubbles, sonoluminescence, wave breaking, steep waves, and heat and gas exchange at the ocean surface).

== Education and career ==
Michael was born in Lenham, Kent in England to Henry Hugh Longuet Longuet-Higgins and Albinia Cecil Bazeley. He had an elder sister Patricia (Pat) and an elder brother Hugh Christopher (Christopher). He was educated at The Pilgrims' School, Winchester and at Winchester College, together with Freeman Dyson, his brother Christopher, and James Lighthill from 1937 to 1943. In 1943, at the age of 17, he won a scholarship in mathematics to Trinity College, Cambridge, where he qualified after just two years for a BA in mathematics in 1945. He was awarded a PhD in geophysics in 1951.

Towards the end of the World War II (December 1943) he started working for the Admiralty Research Laboratory (ARL) in Teddington. He joined Group W (waves) set up on 5 June 1944 under George Deacon. Here he helped predict wave and current conditions in preparation for the Pacific landings. He worked not only on the theory of wind waves but also on the geomagnetic induction of voltages by tidal streams, and on the generation of oceanic microseisms.

In 1948 he returned to Cambridge, to read for a PhD but without a break in his research, just reporting to Sir Harold Jeffreys and later to Robert Stoneley at the end of each term. After being awarded his PhD in geophysics ("just a one hour interview which he almost forgot to attend") in 1951 at Cambridge, he was awarded a 4-year research fellowship (Title A) at Trinity College. The first year (1951–52) he spent in the US as a Commonwealth Fund Fellow, first at the Woods Hole Oceanographic Institute on Cape Cod, Massachusetts, and then at the Scripps Institution of Oceanography at La Jolla, California, with Walter Munk. On his return to England in 1952, he spent two years of his research fellowship in Cambridge. Together with H. S. M. Coxeter and J. C. P. Miller he was first to publish the full list of uniform polyhedra (1954).

He was invited to join the National Institute of Oceanography in Wormley, Surrey, in 1954 (renamed Institute of Oceanographic Science in 1973) then led by George Deacon, studying ocean waves and storm surges. He was elected as a Fellow of the Royal Society in 1963. During this period "of thirteen happy and fruitful years" he had several visiting research appointments, including the Mathematics Department at MIT (1957–58), the University of Adelaide, Australia (1964) and the University of California, San Diego (1961-2 and 1966-7). Between 1967 and 1969 he was Professor of Applied Mathematics and Oceanography at Oregon State University in Corvallis, Oregon.

From 1969 to 1989 he served as a Royal Society Research Professor at the University of Cambridge, working both in the Department of Applied Mathematics and Theoretical Physics (DAMPT), Cambridge, and at The National Institute of Oceanography, Wormley, Surrey. During this time he was also a visiting scientist at Caltech Jet Propulsion Laboratory, Pasadena (1981–89) and adjunct professor at the University of Florida, Gainesville,(1981–87). After his "retirement" in Cambridge in 1989 he moved to California and worked at the La Jolla Institute in San Diego. In 1991, he was appointed to the Institute for Nonlinear Science, University of California, San Diego (UCSD) as a senior research physicist, and to the Scripps Institution of Oceanography with an adjunct professorship until his second "retirement" in 2001. After that he continued work at Scripps as a research physicist emeritus. He remained active in research, at conferences and served on many committees.

== Honours and prizes ==
Michael Longuet-Higgins received many honours and was awarded several prizes including:

- Cambridge University's Rayleigh Prize for Mathematics (1950)
- Fellow of the Royal Society (1963)
- Honorary doctorate of the Technical University of Copenhagen (1979)
- Honorary doctorate of the University of Glasgow (1979)
- Member of the US National Academy of Sciences (1979)
- Fellow of the American Geophysical Union (1981)
- Sverdrup Gold Medal of the American Meteorological Society (1983)
- International Coastal Engineering Award of the American Society of Civil Engineers (1984)
- Oceanography Award of the Society for Underwater Technology (1990)
- Honorary Fellow of the Acoustical Society of America (2002)

== Personal ==
Michael Longuet-Higgins married Joan Redmayne Tattersall on 12 December 1958. Together they had four children, Ruth, Mark, John and Anne all of whom were born in Guildford, England. The children were brought up during the first years in Godalming, England; Del Mar, Torry Pines and La Jolla, California; Corvallis, Oregon; Cambridge and Comberton in England.

== Sources ==
- Of Seas and Ships and Scientists, Anthony Laughton et al. ISBN 978-0-7188-9230-2
- Dynamics of Water Waves, Selected Papers of Michael Longuet-Higgins, editor S.G. Sajjadi. ISBN 978-981-4322-51-5
- MEMOIRS OF FELLOWS OF THE ROYAL SOCIETY: Michael Selwyn Longuet-Higgins. 8 December 1925—26 February 2016

== Books ==
- Longuet-Higgins, M. S. (2013). Sajjadi, S. G. (ed.). Dynamics of Water Waves – Selected Papers of Michael Longuet-Higgins. Advanced Series on Ocean Engineering. Vol. 35. World Scientific. 3 Volumes, 2372 pp. ISBN 978-981-4322-51-5.

== Chronological publications ==
- Full List of Publications
- 1940 to 1949
- 1950 to 1959
- 1960 to 1969
- 1970 to 1979
- 1980 to 1989
- 1990 to 1999
- 2000 to 2009
- 2010 to 2016

== Selected publications ==
- 1954: (with H. S. M. Coxeter and J. C. P. Miller) "Uniform Polyhedra", Philosophical Transactions of the Royal Society A 246: 401–50 doi:10.1098/rsta.1954.0003
