= Jonathan Zenneck =

German physicist and electrical engineer (1871–1959)

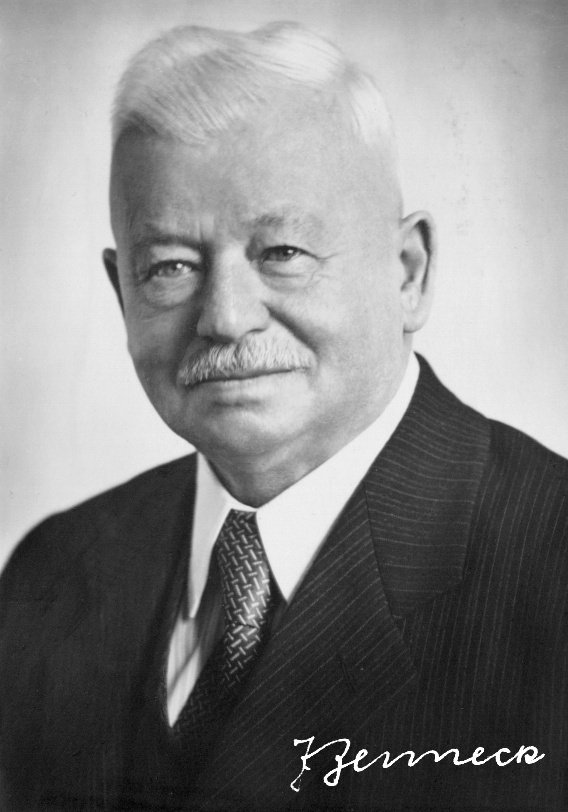
- Zenneck in 1951

Rector of the Technical University of Munich
- In office 1925–1927
- Preceded by: Walther von Dyck
- Succeeded by: Kaspar Dantscher

Personal details
- Born: Jonathan Adolf Wilhelm Zenneck; 15 April 1871 Ruppertshofen, Kingdom of Württemberg, German Empire
- Died: 8 April 1959 (aged 87) Althegnenberg, Bavaria, West Germany
- Scientific career
- Education: University of Tübingen
- Known for: Zenneck wave Oscilloscope
- Awards: IRE Medal of Honor (1928); Werner von Siemens Ring (1956)
- Fields: Physics; Electrical engineering
- Doctoral advisor: Theodor Eimer

Jonathan Adolf Wilhelm Zenneck (/ˈzɛnɛk/; German: [ˈjoːnatan ˈtsɛnɛk]; 15 April 1871 – 8 April 1959) was a German physicist and electrical engineer.

Zenneck improved the cathode-ray tube by adding a second deflection structure at right angles to the first, which allowed two-dimensional viewing of a waveform. This two-dimensional display is fundamental to the oscilloscope.

== Early years ==
Zenneck was born in Ruppertshofen, Württemberg.

In 1885, Zenneck entered the Evangelical-Theological Seminary in Maulbronn. In 1887, while in a Blaubeuren seminary, Zenneck learned Latin, Greek, French, and Hebrew. In 1889, Zenneck enrolled in the University of Tübingen. At the Tübingen Seminary, he studied mathematics and natural sciences. In 1894, Zenneck took the state examination in mathematics and natural sciences and the examination for his doctor's degree. His dissertation, supervised by Theodor Eimer, was on grass snake embryos.

In 1894, Zenneck conducted zoological research (Natural History Museum, London). Between 1894 and 1895, he served in the military.

== Middle years ==
In 1895, Zenneck left zoology and turned over to the new field of radio science, He became assistant to Ferdinand Braun and lecturer at "Physikalisches Institut" in Strasbourg, Alsace. Nikola Tesla's lectures introduced him to the wireless sciences. In 1899, Zenneck started propagation studies of wireless telegraphy, first over land, but then became more interested in the larger ranges that were reached over sea. In 1900 he started ship-to-coast experiments in the North Sea near Cuxhaven, Germany. in 1902 he conducted tests of directional antennas. In 1905, Zenneck left Strasbourg since he was appointed assistant-professor at the Danzig Technische Hochschule and in 1906, he became professor of experimental physics in the Braunschweig Technische Hochschule. Also in 1906, Zenneck wrote "Electromagnetic Oscillations and Wireless Telegraphy", the then standard textbook on the subject). In 1909, he joined Badische Anilin und Sodafabrik in Ludwigshafen to experiment with electrical discharges in air to produce bound nitrogen as fertilizer. In 1913, he became director of the newly created Physics Institute of the Technische Hochschule München.

Zenneck analyzed solutions to Maxwell's equations describing electromagnetic waves that are localized around an interface between a conducting medium and a non-conducting medium. In these solutions, the electric field strength decays exponentially in each medium as distance from the interface increases. These waves are sometimes called Zenneck waves and are relevant to ground waves, radio waves that travel horizontally just above the ground. Zenneck analyzed plane wave solutions having this property; he also analyzed solutions with cylindrical symmetry having this property.

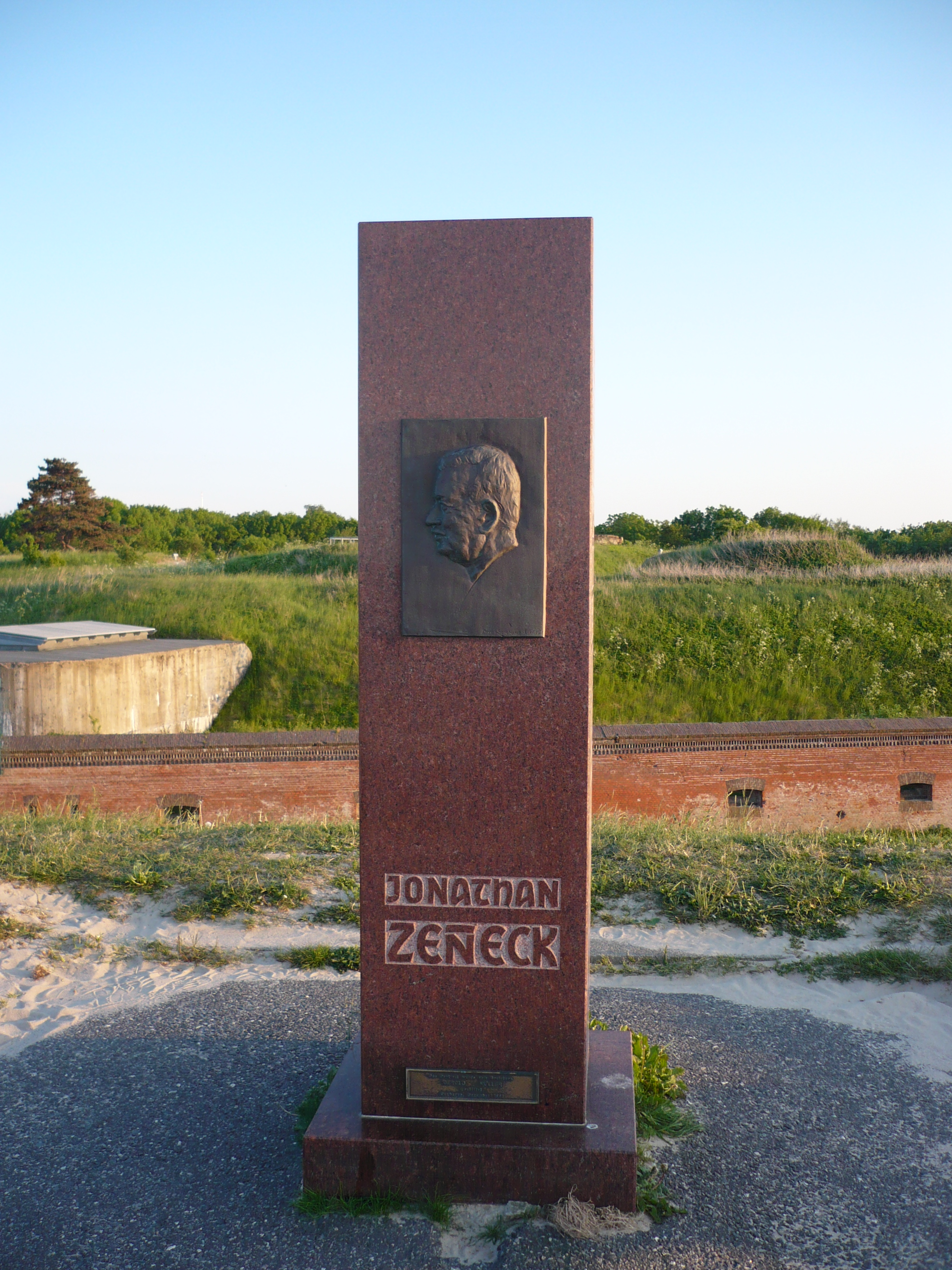
Memorial in Cuxhaven

== Later years ==
Around World War I, Zenneck served on the front-lines as a captain in the Marines. However, in 1914, the German government sent him and Karl Ferdinand Braun to the United States as technical advisor in a patent case involving Telefunken. The US Marconi Company sued Telefunken for patent infringement, a case spurred by the British government in an attempt to shut down transatlantic wireless telegraph between the US and Germany. The case stalled and event went moot when the United States entered the war, declaring Zenneck a Prisoner of War. He was dismissed only in 1920 when he could finally take over the professorship of experimental physics at the Technische Hochschule München. In that time he resumed propagation studies, now with shortwaves and was first in Germany to study the Ionosphere with vertical sounding at his station at Kochel/Bavaria. From the 1930s, Zenneck directed the Deutsches Museum in Munich, and rebuilt it after World War II. Zenneck was awarded the 1928 IRE Medal of Honor for his achievements in basic research on radio technology and for fostering academic and technical offspring he received the Siemens-Ring in 1956.

== See also ==
- Kugelbake
- Spread spectrum
- Surface plasmon
- Ionosonde

== Patents ==
- U.S. patent 1,690,918
- U.S. patent 1,063,760

== Bibliography ==
=== Articles ===
- Jonathan Zenneck,”Über die Fortpflanzung ebener elektromagnetischer Wellen längs einer ebenen Leiterfläche und ihre Beziehung zur drahtlose n Telegraphie” (“On the propagation of plane electromagnetic waves along a planar conductor surface and its relation to wireless telegraphy”), Ann. Physik [4] 23, 846 (1907).

=== Books ===
- Electromagnetic oscillations and wireless telegraphy (Gr., Elektromagnetische Schwingungen und drahtlose Telegraphie). F. Enke, 1905.
- Microwaves and electroacoustics (Gr., Hochfrequenztechnik und Elektroakustik). Volume 1. Academic publishing company Geest & Portig., 1908
- Wireless telegraphy. McGraw-Hill Book Company, inc., 1915.
