= Zenneck wave =

Electromagnetic plane wave

The E-field of a Zenneck surface wave at an air-silver interface.

The Zenneck wave, Zenneck surface wave or Sommerfeld-Zenneck surface wave is a longitudinal, inhomogeneous or non-uniform electromagnetic plane wave incident at the complex Brewster's angle onto a planar or spherical boundary interface between two homogeneous media having different dielectric constants.

The Zenneck wave propagates parallel to the interface and decays exponentially vertical to it, a property known as evanescence. It exists under the condition that the permittivity of one of the materials forming the interface is negative, while the other one is positive, as for example the interface between air and a lossy conducting medium such as the terrestrial transmission line, below the plasma frequency. Arising from original analysis by Arnold Sommerfeld and Jonathan Zenneck of the problem of wave propagation over a lossy earth, it exists as an exact solution to Maxwell's equations.

Recently in 2020, it was demonstrated by Oruganti et al., that it was possible to excite Zenneck wave type waves on flat metal-air interfaces and transmit power across metal obstacles.

== See also ==
- Longitudinal wave
- Body-centric wireless network
- Surface plasmon
- Surface wave
- Lateral wave
- Wireless energy transmission
