= Lateral wave =

Physical phenomenon

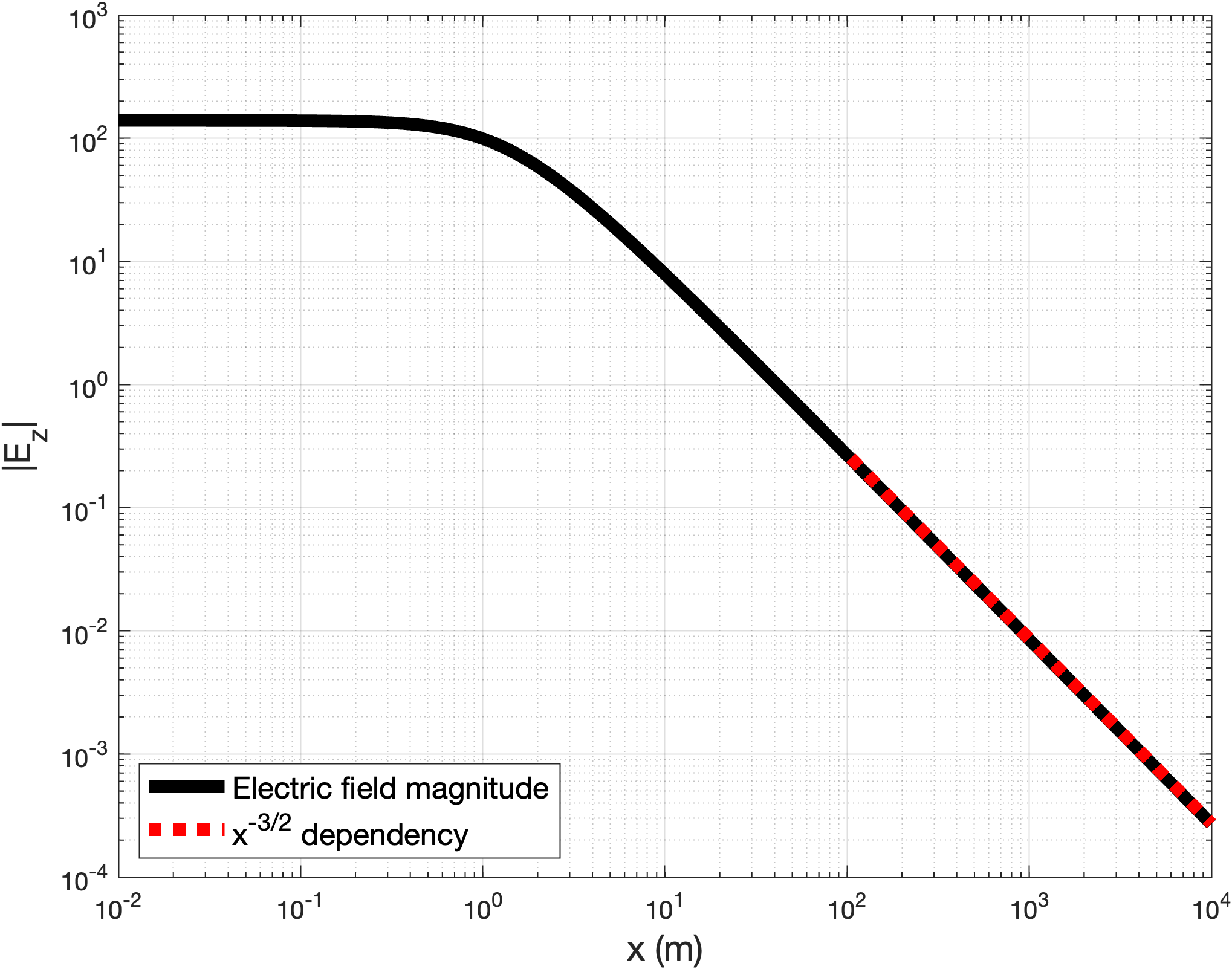
Electric field distribution of a line source on a dielectric half-space. At large distances, the radiated fields showcase lateral wave behavior.

In electromagnetics, acoustics and seismology, lateral waves or head waves are interfacial waves that are launched at or near grazing incidence with respect to the interface of two different media with different physical properties, such as permittivity, acoustic impedance or slowness. While lateral waves are often classified as surface waves, they are distinct from conventional surface waves such as surface plasmon polaritons in optics or surface acoustic waves in acoustics.

Lateral waves play a role in various different physical phenomena, such as radio propagation at large distances, extraordinary optical transmission and total internal reflection. In exploration seismology and geophysics, lateral waves constitute the basis of the seismic refraction method.

== Mathematical formulation ==
The mathematical physics governing lateral waves is analogous across electromagnetics, acoustics, and seismology, as the diffraction mechanisms and boundary conditions for wave coupling share a common theoretical framework; consequently, the following description utilizes an electromagnetic formulation as a representative example. Lateral waves emerge as a specific contribution during the asymptotic evaluation of the Sommerfeld integrals used to solve the inhomogeneous wave equation for a point or line source near a plane interface separating two homogeneous media with different wavenumbers, $k_1$ and $k_2$.

For a magnetic line source located at depth $z'$ in Medium 1 $(z < 0)$, the resulting magnetic field $H$ in that medium can be represented as a Fourier integral:

$$H(y,z) = -\frac{\omega\epsilon_1}{4\pi} \int_{-\infty}^{\infty} \left[ e^{i\kappa_1|z-z'|} + \Gamma(\eta)e^{-i\kappa_1(z+z')} \right] \frac{e^{i\eta y}}{\kappa_1} d\eta$$

where:

- $\eta$ is the horizontal wavenumber.
- $\kappa_j = \sqrt{k_j^2 - \eta^2}$ represents the vertical propagation constant in medium $j$.
- $\Gamma(\eta)$ is the Fresnel reflection coefficient at the interface.

In the complex $\eta$-plane, the integrand contains singularities known as branch points at $\eta = \pm k_1$ and $\eta = \pm k_2$. While conventional surface waves (such as the Zenneck wave) correspond to pole singularities, lateral waves arise mathematically from branch-cut integrations around the branch point of the optically faster medium $(k_2)$.

When the original integration path is deformed into a steepest-descent path for far-field analysis, the contribution from the branch point at $k_2$ provides the lateral wave field. This contribution is mathematically valid only when the observation angle exceeds the critical angle $\theta_c = \sin^{-1}(k_2/k_1)$. Consequently,the phase function of the lateral wave substantiates a physical trajectory that involves coupling between the two media. The field variation is typically proportional to:

$$H_{lateral} \propto \frac{e^{i[k_1(L_1+L_3) + k_2L_2] + i\pi/4}}{(k_2L_2)^{3/2}}$$

In this ray-optical model:

- $L_1$ and $L_3$ are the paths in the slower medium (Medium 1) inclined at the critical angle $\theta_c$.
- $L_2$ is the segment traveled along the interface at the higher speed of Medium 2.
- The $(k_2L_2)^{-3/2}$ term indicates that the lateral wave decays more rapidly than the $1/R$ decay characteristic of spherical space waves.

In seismology and acoustics, lateral or head waves are essential for satisfying the continuity of stress and displacement at the boundary. They represent the energy transport mechanism when the first-order refracted wave vanishes on the interface.

== See also ==
- Ground wave
- Zenneck wave
