= P wave =

Type of seismic wave

Plane P wave

Representation of the propagation of a P wave on a 2D grid (empirical shape)

In continuum mechanics, a P wave (primary wave or pressure wave) is one of the two main types of elastic body waves or seismic waves. P waves travel faster than other seismic waves and hence are the first signal from an earthquake to arrive at any affected location or at a seismograph. P waves may be transmitted through gases, liquids, or solids.

== Nomenclature ==
The name P wave can stand for either pressure wave (as it is formed from alternating compressions and rarefactions) or primary wave (as it has high velocity and is therefore the first wave to be recorded by a seismograph). The name S wave represents another seismic wave propagation mode, standing for secondary or shear wave, a usually more destructive wave than the primary wave.

== Seismic waves in the Earth ==
Velocity of seismic waves in the Earth versus depth. The negligible S wave velocity in the outer core occurs because it is liquid, while in the solid inner core the S wave velocity is non-zero.

Primary and secondary waves are body waves that travel within the Earth. The motion and behavior of both P and S waves in the Earth are monitored to probe the interior structure of the Earth. Discontinuities in velocity as a function of depth are indicative of changes in phase or composition. Differences in arrival times of waves originating in a seismic event like an earthquake as a result of waves taking different paths allow mapping of the Earth's inner structure.

=== P wave shadow zone ===
P wave shadow zone (from USGS)

Almost all the information available on the structure of the Earth's deep interior is derived from observations of the travel times, reflections, refractions and phase transitions of seismic body waves, or normal modes. P waves travel through the fluid layers of the Earth's interior, and yet they are refracted slightly when they pass through the transition between the semisolid mantle and the liquid outer core. As a result, there is a P wave "shadow zone" between 103° and 142° from the earthquake's focus, where the initial P waves are not registered on seismometers. In contrast, S waves do not travel through liquids.

=== As an earthquake warning ===
Advance earthquake warning is possible by detecting the nondestructive primary waves that travel more quickly through the Earth's crust than do the destructive secondary and Rayleigh waves.

The amount of warning depends on the delay between the arrival of the P wave and other destructive waves, generally on the order of seconds up to about 60 to 90 seconds for deep, distant, large quakes such as the 2011 Tohoku earthquake. The effectiveness of a warning depends on accurate detection of the P waves and rejection of ground vibrations caused by local activity (such as trucks or construction). Earthquake early warning systems can be automated to allow for immediate safety actions, such as issuing alerts, stopping elevators at the nearest floors, and switching off utilities.

== Propagation ==
=== Velocity ===
In isotropic and homogeneous solids, a P wave travels in a straight line longitudinally; thus, the particles in the solid vibrate along the axis of propagation (the direction of motion) of the wave energy. The velocity of P waves in that kind of medium is given by
$$v_\mathrm{p} \; = \; \sqrt{ \frac{\, K + \tfrac{4}{3} \mu \;}{\rho} } \; = \; \sqrt{ \frac{\, \lambda + 2 \mu \;}{\rho} }$$
where K is the bulk modulus (the modulus of incompressibility), μ is the shear modulus (modulus of rigidity, sometimes denoted as G and also called the second Lamé parameter), ρ is the density of the material through which the wave propagates, and λ is the first Lamé parameter.

In typical situations in the interior of the Earth, the density ρ usually varies much less than K or μ, so the velocity is mostly "controlled" by these two parameters.

The elastic moduli P-wave modulus, $M$, is defined so that $\, M = K + \tfrac{4}{3} \mu \,$ and thereby
$$v_\mathrm{p} = \sqrt{ \frac{\, M \;}{\rho} }$$

Typical values for P wave velocity in earthquakes are in the range 5 to 8 km/s. The precise speed varies according to the region of the Earth's interior, from less than 6 km/s in the Earth's crust to 13.5 km/s in the lower mantle, and 11 km/s through the inner core.

Velocity in common rock types
Rock Type	Velocity [m/s]	Velocity [ft/s]
Unconsolidated sandstone	4,600–5,200	15,000–17,000
Consolidated sandstone	5,800	19,000
Shale	1,800–4,900	6,000–16,000
Limestone	5,800–6,400	19,000–21,000
Dolomite	6,400–7,300	21,000–24,000
Anhydrite	6,100	20,000
Granite	5,800–6,100	19,000–20,000
Gabbro	7,200	23,600

Geologist Francis Birch discovered a relationship between the velocity of P waves and the density of the material the waves are traveling in:
$$v_\mathrm{p} = a ( \bar{M} ) + b \, \rho$$
which later became known as Birch's law. (The symbol a() is an empirically tabulated function, and b is a constant.)

== See also ==
- Earthquake warning system
- Lamb waves
- Love wave
- S wave
- Surface wave
