= Ground wave =

Radio wave propagating along the Earth's surface

Ground wave is a mode of radio propagation that consists of currents traveling through the earth. Ground waves propagate parallel to and adjacent to the surface of the Earth, and are capable of covering long distances by diffracting around the Earth's curvature. This radiation is also known as the Norton surface wave, or more properly the Norton ground wave, because ground waves in radio propagation are not confined to the surface. Groundwave contrasts with line-of-sight propagation that requires no medium, and skywave via the ionosphere.

Ground wave is important for radio signals below 30 MHz, but is generally insignificant at higher frequencies where line-of-sight propagation dominates. AM and longwave broadcasting, navigation systems such as LORAN, low-frequency time signals, non-directional beacons, and short-range HF communications all make use of it. Range depends on frequency and ground conductivity, with lower frequencies and higher ground conductivity permitting longer distances.

== Overview ==
Lower frequency radio waves, below 3 MHz, travel efficiently as ground waves. As losses increase with frequency, high frequency transmissions between 3 and 30 MHz have more modest groundwave range and groundwave is unimportant above 30 MHz. Surface conductivity affects the propagation of ground waves, with highly conductive surfaces such as sea water providing the best propagation, and dry ground and ice performing the worst.

As the distance increases, ground waves spread out according to the inverse-square law. The imperfect conductivity of the ground tilts the waves forward, dissipating energy into the ground. The long wavelengths of these signals allow them to diffract over the horizon, but this leads to further losses. Signal strength tends to fall exponentially with distance once the Earth's curvature is significant. Above about 10 kHz, atmospheric refraction helps bend waves downward. Only vertically polarized waves travel well; horizontally polarized signals are heavily attenuated.

Groundwave signals are relatively immune to fading but changes in the ground can cause variation in signal strength. Attenuation over land is lowest in the winter in temperate climates and higher over water when seas are rough. Hills, mountains, urban areas, and forests can create areas of reduced signal strength. The penetration depth of ground waves varies, reaching tens of meters at medium frequencies over dry ground and even more at lower frequencies. Propagation predictions thus require knowing the electrical properties of subsurface layers, which are best measured from groundwave attenuation.

== Applications ==
Most low-frequency radio communication is via groundwave propagation. Groundwave is also the primary mode for medium frequencies during the day when skywave is absent, and can be useful at high frequencies at short ranges. Uses include navigation signals, low-frequency time signals, longwave radio, and AM radio. The increased effectiveness of groundwave at lower frequencies gives AM radio stations more coverage at the low end of the band. High frequency over-the-horizon radar may use groundwave at moderate ranges but skywave at longer distances. Military communications in the very low and low frequency range uses ground wave, especially to reach ships and submarines, as groundwaves at these long wavelengths penetrate well below the sea surface.

In the development of radio, ground waves were used extensively. Early commercial and professional radio services relied exclusively on long wave, low frequencies and ground-wave propagation. To prevent interference with these services, amateur and experimental transmitters were restricted to the high frequencies (HF), felt to be useless since their ground-wave range was limited. Upon discovery of the other propagation modes possible at medium wave and short wave frequencies, the advantages of HF for commercial and military purposes became apparent. Amateur experimentation was then confined to only authorized frequencies in the range.

== Modeling ==
In the 1930s, Alfred Norton was the first author to accurately describe groundwave mathematically, deriving an equation for field strength over a flat earth. Van der Pol and Bremmer published calculations for a spherical Earth from 1937 to 1939. Later work focused on paths with variable conductivity, the effects of terrain and objects on the ground, and computer modeling.

== Related terms ==
Mediumwave and shortwave reflect off the ionosphere at night, which is known as skywave. During daylight hours, the lower D layer of the ionosphere forms and absorbs lower frequency energy. This prevents skywave propagation from being very effective on mediumwave frequencies in daylight hours. At night, when the D layer dissipates, mediumwave transmissions travel better by skywave. Ground waves do not include ionospheric and tropospheric waves.

== See also ==
- Lateral wave
