= S wave =

Type of elastic body wave

Plane shear wave

Propagation of a spherical S wave in a 2d grid (empirical model)

In solid mechanics, S waves, secondary waves, or shear waves (sometimes called elastic S waves) are a type of elastic wave and are one of the two main types of elastic body waves, so named because they move through the body of an object, unlike surface waves.

S waves are transverse waves, meaning that the direction of particle movement of an S wave is perpendicular to the direction of wave propagation, and the main restoring force comes from shear stress. Therefore, S waves cannot propagate in liquids with zero (or very low) viscosity; however, they may propagate in liquids with high viscosity. Similarly, S waves cannot travel through gases.

The name secondary wave comes from the fact that they are the second type of wave to be detected by an earthquake seismograph, after the compressional primary wave, or P wave, because S waves travel more slowly in solids. Unlike P waves, S waves cannot travel through the molten outer core of the Earth, and this causes a shadow zone for S waves opposite to their origin. They can still propagate through the solid inner core: when a P wave strikes the boundary of molten and solid cores at an oblique angle, S waves will form and propagate in the solid medium. When these S waves hit the boundary again at an oblique angle, they will in turn create P waves that propagate through the liquid medium. This property allows seismologists to determine some physical properties of the Earth's inner core.

== History ==
In 1830, the mathematician Siméon Denis Poisson presented to the French Academy of Sciences an essay ("memoir") with a theory of the propagation of elastic waves in solids. In his memoir, he states that an earthquake would produce two different waves: one having a certain speed $a$ and the other having a speed $\frac{a}{\sqrt 3}$. At a sufficient distance from the source, when they can be considered plane waves in the region of interest, the first kind consists of expansions and compressions in the direction perpendicular to the wavefront (that is, parallel to the wave's direction of motion); while the second consists of stretching motions occurring in directions parallel to the front (perpendicular to the direction of motion).

== Theory ==
=== Isotropic medium ===
Velocity of seismic waves in the Earth versus depth. The negligible S wave velocity in the outer core occurs because it is liquid, while in the solid inner core the S wave velocity is non-zero.

For the purpose of this explanation, a solid medium is considered isotropic if its strain (deformation) in response to stress is the same in all directions. Let $\boldsymbol{u} = (u_1,u_2,u_3)$ be the displacement vector of a particle of such a medium from its "resting" position $\boldsymbol{x}=(x_1,x_2,x_3)$ due elastic vibrations, understood to be a function of the rest position $\boldsymbol{x}$ and time $t$. The deformation of the medium at that point can be described by the strain tensor $\boldsymbol{e}$, the 3×3 matrix whose elements are
$$e_{i j} = \tfrac{1}{2} \left( \partial_i u_j + \partial_j u_i \right)$$

where $\partial_i$ denotes partial derivative with respect to position coordinate $x_i$. The strain tensor is related to the 3×3 stress tensor $\boldsymbol{\tau}$ by the equation
$$\tau_{i j} = \lambda\delta_{i j}\sum_{k} e_{k k} + 2\mu e_{i j}$$

Here $\delta_{ij}$ is the Kronecker delta (1 if $i = j$, 0 otherwise) and $\lambda$ and $\mu$ are the Lamé parameters ($\mu$ being the material's shear modulus). It follows that
$$\tau_{i j} = \lambda\delta_{i j} \sum_{k} \partial_k u_k + \mu \left( \partial_i u_j + \partial_j u_i \right)$$

From Newton's law of inertia, one also gets
$$\rho \partial_t^2 u_i = \sum_j \partial_j\tau_{i j}$$
where $\rho$ is the density (mass per unit volume) of the medium at that point, and $\partial_t$ denotes partial derivative with respect to time. Combining the last two equations one gets the seismic wave equation in homogeneous media
$$\rho \partial_t^2 u_i = \lambda\partial_i \sum_k \partial_k u_k + \mu\sum_j \bigl(\partial_i\partial_j u_j + \partial_j\partial_j u_i\bigr)$$

Using the nabla operator notation of vector calculus, $\nabla = (\partial_1, \partial_2, \partial_3)$, with some approximations, this equation can be written as
$$\rho \partial_t^2 \boldsymbol{u} = \left(\lambda + 2\mu \right) \nabla\left(\nabla \cdot \boldsymbol{u}\right) - \mu\nabla \times \left(\nabla \times \boldsymbol{u}\right)$$

Taking the curl of this equation and applying vector identities, one gets
$$\partial_t^2(\nabla\times\boldsymbol{u}) = \frac{\mu}{\rho}\nabla^2 \left(\nabla\times\boldsymbol{u}\right)$$

This formula is the wave equation applied to the vector quantity $\nabla\times \boldsymbol{u}$, which is the material's shear strain. Its solutions, the S waves, are linear combinations of sinusoidal plane waves of various wavelengths and directions of propagation, but all with the same speed $\beta = \sqrt{\mu/\rho}$. Assuming that the medium of propagation is linear, elastic, isotropic, and homogeneous, this equation can be rewritten as $\mu=\rho \beta^2=\rho \omega^2 / k^2$ where ω is the angular frequency and k is the wavenumber. Thus, $\beta = \omega / k$.

Taking the divergence of seismic wave equation in homogeneous media, instead of the curl, yields a wave equation describing propagation of the quantity $\nabla \cdot \boldsymbol{u}$, which is the material's compression strain. The solutions of this equation, the P waves, travel at the faster speed $\alpha = \sqrt{(\lambda + 2\mu)/\rho}$.

The steady state SH waves are defined by the Helmholtz equation
$$\left(\nabla^2 + k^2 \right) \boldsymbol{u}=0$$
where k is the wave number.

=== S waves in viscoelastic materials ===
Similar to in an elastic medium, in a viscoelastic material, the speed of a shear wave is described by a similar relationship $c(\omega) = \omega / k(\omega)=\sqrt{\mu(\omega)/\rho}$, however, here, $\mu$ is a complex, frequency-dependent shear modulus and $c(\omega)$ is the frequency dependent phase velocity. One common approach to describing the shear modulus in viscoelastic materials is through the Voigt Model which states: $\mu(\omega)=\mu_0+i\omega\eta$, where $\mu_0$ is the stiffness of the material and $\eta$ is the viscosity.

== S wave technology ==
=== Magnetic resonance elastography ===
Magnetic resonance elastography (MRE) is a method for studying the properties of biological materials in living organisms by propagating shear waves at desired frequencies throughout the desired organic tissue. This method uses a vibrator to send the shear waves into the tissue and magnetic resonance imaging to view the response in the tissue. The measured wave speed and wavelengths are then measured to determine elastic properties such as the shear modulus. MRE has seen use in studies of a variety of human tissues including liver, brain, and bone tissues.

== See also ==
- Earthquake Early Warning (Japan)
- Lamb waves
- Longitudinal wave
- Love wave
- Rayleigh wave
- Shear wave splitting
