= Longitudinal wave =

Type of wave

Nonfree image: detailed animation of a longitudinal wave
- Detailed animation of longitudinal wave motion (CC-BY-NC-ND 4.0)

A type of longitudinal wave: A plane pressure pulse wave.

Longitudinal waves are waves which oscillate in the direction which is parallel to the direction in which the wave travels and displacement of the medium is in the same (or opposite) direction of the wave propagation. Mechanical longitudinal waves are also called compressional or compression waves, because they produce compression and rarefaction when travelling through a medium, and pressure waves, because they produce increases and decreases in pressure. A wave along the length of a stretched Slinky toy, where the distance between coils increases and decreases, is a good visualization. Real-world examples include sound waves (vibrations in pressure, a particle of displacement, and particle velocity propagated in an elastic medium) and seismic P waves (created by earthquakes and explosions).

The other main type of wave is the transverse wave, in which the displacements of the medium are at right angles to the direction of propagation. Transverse waves, for instance, describe some bulk sound waves in solid materials (but not in fluids); these are also called "shear waves" to differentiate them from the (longitudinal) pressure waves that these materials also support.

== Nomenclature ==
"Longitudinal waves" and "transverse waves" have been abbreviated by some authors as "L-waves" and "T-waves", respectively, for their own convenience. While these two abbreviations have specific meanings in seismology (L-wave for Love wave or long wave) and electrocardiography (see T wave), some authors chose to use "ℓ-waves" (lowercase 'L') and "t-waves" instead, although they are not commonly found in physics writings except for some popular science books.

== Sound waves ==
For longitudinal harmonic sound waves, the frequency and wavelength can be described by the formula
$$\ y(x,t) = y_\mathsf{o}\cdot\cos\!\Bigl(\ \omega\cdot\left( t - \tfrac{\ x\ }{ c } \right)\ \Bigr)\$$
where:

- $\ y\ ~~$ is the displacement of the point on the traveling sound wave.
  Representation of the propagation of an omnidirectional pulse wave on a 2‑D grid (empirical shape)
- $\ x\ ~~$ is the distance from the point to the wave's source.
- $\ t\ ~~$ is the time elapsed.
- $\ y_\mathsf{o}\$ is the amplitude of the oscillations.
- $\ c\ ~~$ is the speed of the wave.
- $\ \omega ~~$ is the angular frequency of the wave.

The quantity $\ \frac{\ x\ }{ c }\$ is the time that the wave takes to travel the distance $\ x ~.$

The ordinary frequency ($\ f\$) of the wave is given by
$$f = \frac{ \omega }{\ 2 \pi\ } ~.$$

The wavelength can be calculated as the relation between a wave's speed and ordinary frequency.
$$\lambda =\frac{ c }{\ f\ } ~.$$

For sound waves, the amplitude of the wave is the difference between the pressure of the undisturbed air and the maximum pressure caused by the wave.

Sound's propagation speed depends on the type, temperature, and composition of the medium through which it propagates.

== Speed of longitudinal waves ==
=== Isotropic medium ===
For isotropic solids and liquids, the speed of a longitudinal wave can be described by
$$\ v_\ell = \sqrt{ \frac{~ E_\ell\ }{ \rho }\ }\$$
where

- $\ E_\ell\ ~~$ is the elastic modulus, such that $\ E_\ell = K_b + \frac{\ 4G\ }{ 3 }\$
  where $\ G\ ~~$ is the shear modulus and $\ K_b\$ is the bulk modulus.
- $\ \rho ~~~$ is the mass density of the medium.

== Attenuation of longitudinal waves ==
The attenuation of a wave in a medium describes the loss of energy a wave carries as it propagates throughout the medium. This is caused by the scattering of the wave at interfaces, the loss of energy due to the friction between molecules, or geometric divergence. The study of attenuation of elastic waves in materials has increased in recent years, particularly within the study of polycrystalline materials where researchers aim to "nondestructively evaluate the degree of damage of engineering components" and to "develop improved procedures for characterizing microstructures".

=== Attenuation in viscoelastic materials ===
In viscoelastic materials, the attenuation coefficients per length $\ \alpha_\ell\$ for longitudinal waves and $\ \alpha_T\$ for transverse waves must satisfy the following ratio:
$$\ \frac{~\ \alpha_\ell\ }{~\ \alpha_T\ } ~\geq~ \frac{~ 4\ c_T^3\ }{~ 3\ c_\ell^3\ }\$$
where $\ c_T\$ and $\ c_\ell\$ are the transverse and longitudinal wave speeds respectively.

=== Attenuation in polycrystalline materials ===
Polycrystalline materials are made up of various crystal grains which form the bulk material. Due to the difference in crystal structure and properties of these grains, when a wave propagating through a poly-crystal crosses a grain boundary, a scattering event occurs causing scattering based attenuation of the wave. Additionally it has been shown that the ratio rule for viscoelastic materials,
$$\frac{~\ \alpha_\ell\ }{~\ \alpha_T\ } ~\geq~ \frac{~ 4\ c_T^3\ }{~ 3\ c_\ell^3\ }$$
applies equally successfully to polycrystalline materials.

A current prediction for modeling attenuation of waves in polycrystalline materials with elongated grains is the second-order approximation (SOA) model which accounts the second order of inhomogeneity allowing for the consideration multiple scattering in the crystal system. This model predicts that the shape of the grains in a poly-crystal has little effect on attenuation.

== Pressure waves ==
The equations for sound in a fluid given above also apply to acoustic waves in an elastic solid. Although solids also support transverse waves (known as S-waves in seismology), longitudinal sound waves in the solid exist with a velocity and wave impedance dependent on the material's density and its rigidity, the latter of which is described (as with sound in a gas) by the material's bulk modulus.

In May 2022, NASA reported the sonification (converting astronomical data associated with pressure waves into sound) of the black hole at the center of the Perseus galaxy cluster.

== Electromagnetics ==
Maxwell's equations lead to the prediction of electromagnetic waves in a vacuum, which are strictly transverse waves; due to the fact that they would need particles to vibrate upon, the electric and magnetic fields of which the wave consists are perpendicular to the direction of the wave's propagation. However plasma waves are longitudinal since these are not electromagnetic waves but density waves of charged particles, but which can couple to the electromagnetic field.

After Heaviside's attempts to generalize Maxwell's equations, Heaviside concluded that electromagnetic waves were not to be found as longitudinal waves in "free space" or homogeneous media. Maxwell's equations, as we now understand them, retain that conclusion: in free-space or other uniform isotropic dielectrics, electro-magnetic waves are strictly transverse. However electromagnetic waves can display a longitudinal component in the electric and/or magnetic fields when traversing birefringent materials, or inhomogeneous materials especially at interfaces (surface waves for instance) such as Zenneck waves.

In the development of modern physics, Alexandru Proca (1897–1955) was known for developing relativistic quantum field equations bearing his name (Proca's equations) which apply to the massive vector spin-1 mesons. In recent decades some other theorists, such as Jean-Pierre Vigier and Bo Lehnert of the Swedish Royal Society, have used the Proca equation in an attempt to demonstrate photon mass as a longitudinal electromagnetic component of Maxwell's equations, suggesting that longitudinal electromagnetic waves could exist in a Dirac polarized vacuum. However photon rest mass is strongly doubted by almost all physicists and is incompatible with the Standard Model of physics.

== See also ==
- Transverse wave
- Sound
- Acoustic wave
- P-wave
- Plasma waves
