= Transverse wave =

Moving wave that has oscillations perpendicular to the direction of the wave

Illustration of a simple (plane) transverse wave propagating through an elastic medium in the horizontal direction, with particles being displaced in the vertical direction. Only one layer of the material is shown

Illustration of the electric (red) and magnetic (blue) fields along a ray in a simple light wave. For any plane perpendicular to the ray, each field has always the same value at all points of the plane.

Propagation of a transverse spherical wave in a 2d grid (empirical model)

In physics, a transverse wave is a wave that oscillates perpendicularly to the direction of the wave's advance. In contrast, a longitudinal wave travels in the direction of its oscillations. All waves move energy from place to place without transporting the matter in the transmission medium if there is one. Electromagnetic waves are transverse without requiring a medium. The designation “transverse” indicates the direction of the wave is perpendicular to the displacement of the particles of the medium through which it passes, or in the case of EM waves, the oscillation is perpendicular to the direction of the wave.

A simple example is given by the waves that can be created on a horizontal length of string by anchoring one end and moving the other end up and down. Another example is the waves that are created on the membrane of a drum. The waves propagate in directions that are parallel to the membrane plane, but each point in the membrane itself gets displaced up and down, perpendicular to that plane. Light is another example of a transverse wave, where the oscillations are the electric and magnetic fields, which point at right angles to the ideal light rays that describe the direction of propagation.

Transverse waves commonly occur in elastic solids due to the shear stress generated; the oscillations in this case are the displacement of the solid particles away from their relaxed position, in directions perpendicular to the propagation of the wave. These displacements correspond to a local shear deformation of the material. Hence a transverse wave of this nature is called a shear wave. Since fluids cannot resist shear forces while at rest, propagation of transverse waves inside the bulk of fluids is not possible. In seismology, shear waves are also called secondary waves or S-waves.

Transverse waves are contrasted with longitudinal waves, where the oscillations occur in the direction of the wave. The standard example of a longitudinal wave is a sound wave or "pressure wave" in gases, liquids, or solids, whose oscillations cause compression and expansion of the material through which the wave is propagating. Pressure waves are also called "primary waves", or "P-waves" in geophysics, because they appear first in a seismogram due to their higher propagation velocity in comparison with shear waves that come second.

Water waves involve both longitudinal and transverse motions.

== Mathematical formulation ==
Mathematically, the simplest kind of transverse wave is a plane linearly polarized sinusoidal one. "Plane" here means that the direction of propagation is unchanging and the same over the whole medium; "linearly polarized" means that the direction of displacement too is unchanging and the same over the whole medium; and the magnitude of the displacement is a sinusoidal function only of time and of position along the direction of propagation.

The motion of such a wave can be expressed mathematically as follows. Let $\widehat{d}$ be the direction of propagation (a vector with unit length), and $\vec{o}$ any reference point in the medium. Let $\widehat{u}$ be the direction of the oscillations (another unit-length vector perpendicular to d). The displacement of a particle at any point $\vec{p}$ of the medium and any time t (seconds) will be
$$S(\vec{p},t) = A \sin\left( (2\pi)\frac{t-\frac{(\vec{p}-\vec{o})}{v}\cdot\widehat{d}}{T} + \phi\right) \widehat{u}$$
where A is the wave's amplitude or strength, T is its period, v is the speed of propagation, and $\phi$ is its phase at t = 0 seconds at $\vec{o}$. All these parameters are real numbers. The symbol "•" denotes the inner product of two vectors.

By this equation, the wave travels in the direction $\widehat{d}$ and the oscillations occur back and forth along the direction $\widehat{u}$. The wave is said to be linearly polarized in the direction $\widehat{u}$.

An observer that looks at a fixed point $\vec{p}$ will see the particle there move in a simple harmonic (sinusoidal) motion with period T seconds, with maximum particle displacement A in each sense; that is, with a frequency of f = 1/T full oscillation cycles every second. A snapshot of all particles at a fixed time t will show the same displacement for all particles on each plane perpendicular to $\widehat{d}$, with the displacements in successive planes forming a sinusoidal pattern, with each full cycle extending along $\widehat{d}$ by the wavelength λ = v T = v/f. The whole pattern moves in the direction $\widehat{d}$with speed V.

The same equation describes a plane linearly polarized sinusoidal light wave, except that the "displacement" S($\vec{p}$, t) is the electric field at point $\vec{p}$ and time t. (The magnetic field will be described by the same equation, but with a "displacement" direction that is perpendicular to both $\widehat{d}$ and $\widehat{u}$, and a different amplitude.)

=== Superposition principle ===
In a homogeneous linear medium, complex oscillations (vibrations in a material or light flows) can be described as the superposition of many simple sinusoidal waves, either transverse or longitudinal.

The vibrations of a violin string create standing waves, for example, which can be analyzed as the sum of many transverse waves of different frequencies moving in opposite directions to each other, that displace the string either up or down or left to right. The antinodes of the waves align in a superposition .

=== Circular polarization ===
If the medium is linear and allows multiple independent displacement directions for the same travel direction $\widehat{d}$, we can choose two mutually perpendicular directions of polarization, and express any wave linearly polarized in any other direction as a linear combination (mixing) of those two waves.

By combining two waves with same frequency, velocity, and direction of travel, but with different phases and independent displacement directions, one obtains a circularly or elliptically polarized wave. In such a wave the particles describe circular or elliptical trajectories, instead of moving back and forth.

It may help understanding to revisit the thought experiment with a taut string mentioned above. Notice that you can also launch waves on the string by moving your hand to the right and left instead of up and down. This is an important point. There are two independent (orthogonal) directions that the waves can move. (This is true for any two directions at right angles, up and down and right and left are chosen for clarity.) Any waves launched by moving your hand in a straight line are linearly polarized waves.

But now imagine moving your hand in a circle. Your motion will launch a spiral wave on the string. You are moving your hand simultaneously both up and down and side to side. The maxima of the side to side motion occur a quarter wavelength (or a quarter of a way around the circle, that is 90 degrees or π/2 radians) from the maxima of the up and down motion. At any point along the string, the displacement of the string will describe the same circle as your hand, but delayed by the propagation speed of the wave. Notice also that you can choose to move your hand in a clockwise circle or a counter-clockwise circle. These alternate circular motions produce right and left circularly polarized waves.

To the extent your circle is imperfect, a regular motion will describe an ellipse, and produce elliptically polarized waves. At the extreme of eccentricity your ellipse will become a straight line, producing linear polarization along the major axis of the ellipse. An elliptical motion can always be decomposed into two orthogonal linear motions of unequal amplitude and 90 degrees out of phase, with circular polarization being the special case where the two linear motions have the same amplitude.

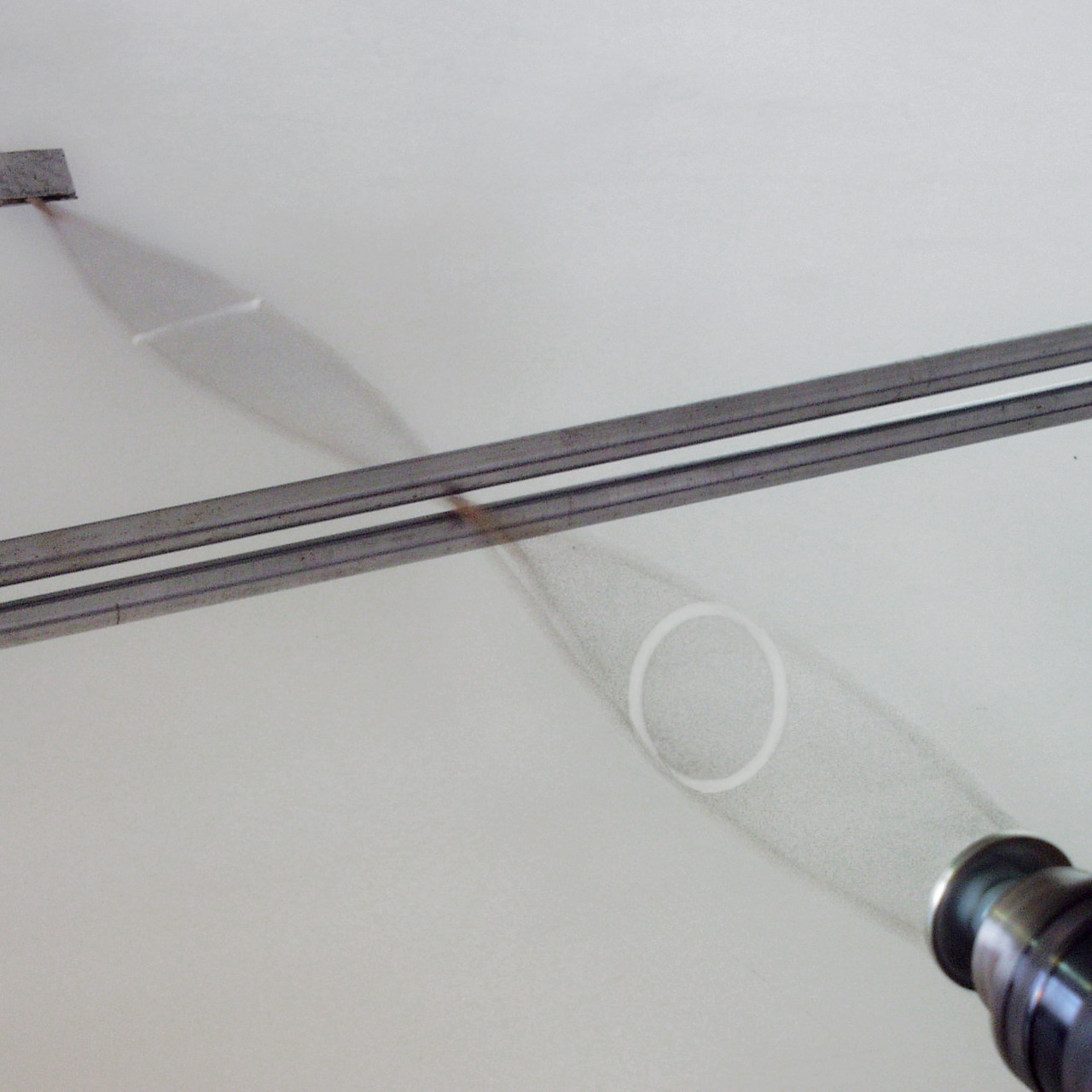
Circular polarization mechanically generated on a rubber thread, converted to linear polarization by a mechanical polarizing filter.

=== Power in a transverse wave in string ===
(Let the linear mass density of the string be μ.)

The kinetic energy of a mass element in a transverse wave is given by:
$$dK = \frac 1 2 \ dm \ v_y^2 = \frac12 \ \mu dx \ A^2 \omega^2 \cos^2 \left(\frac{2 \pi x}{\lambda} - \omega t\right)$$

In one wavelength, kinetic energy
$$K = \frac 1 2 \mu A ^2 \omega^2 \int ^\lambda _0 \cos^2 \left(\frac{2 \pi x}{\lambda} - \omega t\right) dx = \frac14 \mu A^2 \omega^2 \lambda$$

Using Hooke's law the potential energy in mass element
$$dU = \frac 1 2 \ dm \omega ^ 2 \ y ^ 2 = \frac 1 2 \ \mu dx \omega ^ 2 \ A^2 \sin^2 \left(\frac{2 \pi x}{\lambda} - \omega t\right)$$

And the potential energy for one wavelength
$$U = \frac 1 2 \mu A ^2 \omega^2 \int ^\lambda _0 \sin^2 \left(\frac{2 \pi x}{\lambda} - \omega t\right) dx = \frac 1 4 \mu A^2 \omega^2 \lambda$$

So, total energy in one wavelength $K + U = \frac 1 2 \mu A^2 \omega^2 \lambda$

Therefore average power is $\frac 1 2 \mu A^2 \omega^2 v_x$

== See also ==
- Longitudinal wave
- Luminiferous aether – the postulated medium for light waves; accepting that light was a transverse wave prompted a search for evidence of this physical medium
- Shear wave splitting
- Sinusoidal plane-wave solutions of the electromagnetic wave equation
- Transverse mode
- Shear wave elastography
- Shear-wave elasticity imaging
