= Karl Bernhard Zoeppritz =

German geophysicist and seismologist (1881–1908)

- Born: 22 October 1881; Heidenheim an der Brenz, Germany
- Died: 20 July 1908 (aged 26)
- Education: University of Freiburg, Ludwig-Maximilians-Universität München
- Known for: Zoeppritz equations
- Scientific career
- Fields: Geophysics
- Workplaces: University of Göttingen

Karl Bernhard Zoeppritz (22 October 1881 – 20 July 1908) was a German geophysicist who made important contributions to seismology, in particular the formulation of the Zoeppritz equations.

These equations relate the amplitudes of P-waves and S-waves at each side of an interface, between two arbitrary elastic media, as a function of the angle of incidence and are largely used in reflection seismology for determining structure and properties of the subsurface.

== Early life ==
Zoeppritz was born on 22 October 1881 in Mergelstetten, a small village several miles south of Heidenheim an der Brenz. He studied natural science and geology at the Ludwig-Maximilians-Universität München and the University of Freiburg, finishing his education with a doctoral dissertation on the geology of part of the Swiss Alps in 1905, at the University of Freiburg. Following the completion of his doctorate, in the summer of 1906 at the University of Karlsruhe, Zoeppritz passed the Oberlehrerexamen, a teaching certificate that allowed him to lecture at a university.

== Work in geophysics ==
Zoeppritz became interested in the application of physics in geology, but the field of geophysics was still in its infancy. The only place in Germany where Zoeppritz could specifically study geophysics was at the University of Göttingen, as an assistant in the influential Emil Wiechert's research group.

Using Wiechert's theoretical work and data from earthquakes including the 1905 Kangra earthquake, 1905 Calabria earthquake and the 1906 San Francisco earthquake, Zoeppritz's most important early contribution was the construction of travel-time curves – and their associated velocity-depth functions – for P-waves, S-waves and surface waves, recognising for the first time that body waves are reflected and converted at discontinuities. These curves were later used by other members of the research group, Ludwig Carl Geiger and Beno Gutenberg, as well as the British astronomer and seismologist Herbert Hall Turner at the International Seismological Summary. The related ill-posed inverse problem of inferring a discrete velocity distribution, representing the layers of the crust and mantle, was solved by fellow Göttingen mathematician Gustav Herglotz.

Zoeppritz used Wiechert's work and went on to derive a full set of transmission and reflection coefficients for a plane wave approaching a discontinuity. Zoeppritz was not the first to mathematically describe this phenomenon as the British seismologist Cargill Gilston Knott used a different approach to derive Knott's equations in 1899, but this was still unknown in Germany by the 1920s. The equations that Zoeppritz described are now named after him (Zoeppritz equations) and are used extensively in reflection seismology (particularly amplitude versus offset), for a number of applications including hydrocarbon exploration.

== Death and legacy ==
In the summer of 1908, at the age of 26, Zoeppritz died after succumbing to an infectious illness of several months. He accomplished all of his work at Göttingen in just two years, but much of it was left unpublished at the time of his death. Much of the unpublished work was revised and published by Wiechert, Gutenberg and Geiger, with his most important work that described the reflection and transmission of seismic waves in elastic media – the Zoeppritz equations – not being published until 1919.

In 2002, the German Geophysical Society (DGG) began awarding the Zoeppritz Prize to outstanding young geophysicists.
