= Eugene Island block 330 oil field =

Oil field in the Gulf of Mexico

Coordinates: 28°14′N 91°44′W

- Country: United States
- Region: Gulf of Mexico
- Block: Eugen Island 313, 314 south, 330, 331, 332, 337, 338
- Offshore/onshore: offshore
- Operators: Apache Corporation; Devon Energy

Field history
- Discovery: 1971
- Start of development: 1971
- Start of production: 1972
- Peak year: 1977

Production
- Peak of production (oil): 95,290 barrels per day (~4.748×10^{6} t/a)
- Peak of production (gas): 482 million cubic feet per day (13.6×10^{6} m^{3}/d)
- Producing formations: Pliocene-Pleistocene sands

Eugene Island block 330 oil field is an oil field in the United States Exclusive Economic Zone in the Gulf of Mexico. It is located 170 miles (270 km) southwest of New Orleans, 70–85 miles (113–137 km) off the Louisiana coast comprising six and a half leased blocks: Eugene Island 313, 314 south, 330, 331, 332, 337 and 338.

== History ==
In the outer continental shelf lease sale on December 15, 1970 240,361 hectares (593,940 acres) were offered for lease, including Eugene Island blocks. The Block 330 area was acquired by Pennzoil (now part of Royal Dutch Shell). As the Pliocene-Pleistocene sands were considered geochemically immature and wells drilled to the north of Block 330 discovered natural gas, Pennzoil expected to discover a natural gas not oil. The oil field was discovered in March 1971 while drilling the 1 OCS G-2115 well. Approximately at the same time oil was discovered by Royal Dutch Shell in the adjoining block 331.

By the end of 1971, two platforms had been installed in the field. The first development well was drilled on Block 330 by Pennzoil's "A" platform in November 1971. Production started in September 1972 in the block 331. During 1972 four more platforms were installed and later the number of platforms increased to nine.

From 1975 to 1980, the field was the largest producing field in the Federal outer continental shelf. Production peaked in 1977 by 95,290 barrels (15,150 m^{3}) of liquids (crude oil and gas liquids) and 482 million cubic feet (13.6×10^{6} m^{3}) per day. Enhanced oil recovery operations started in August 1975. Water injection was used on blocks 331 and 314, and starting from December 1979 gas injection was used on block 330.

== Geology ==
The field is an anticlinal structure on the downthrown side of a major salt diapir associated growth fault and produces from 25 Pliocene-Pleistocene delta-front sandstone reservoirs at depths from 1290 to 3600 m. The structure was located with reconnaissance reflection seismology 2D lines recorded from 1966 to 1970, coupled with well data defined lithofacies and isopach maps indicating large delta systems. Relative amplitude seismic profiles reveal "prominent hydrocarbon indicators" such as bright spots and flat spots, and seismic facies analysis show shingled, oblique and sigmoid reflections typical for delta-front sandstones.

== Depletion rate ==
The oil field is best known for the controversy surrounding its depletion rate. According to a 1999 article in The Wall Street Journal:

Something mysterious is going on at Eugene Island 330. Production at the oil field, deep in the Gulf of Mexico off the coast of Louisiana, was supposed to have declined years ago. And for a while, it behaved like any normal field: Following its 1973 discovery, Eugene Island 330's output peaked at about 15,000 barrels per day (2,400 m^{3}/d). By 1989, production had slowed to about 4,000 barrels per day (640 m^{3}/d). Then suddenly – some say almost inexplicably – Eugene Island's fortunes reversed. The field, operated by PennzEnergy Co., is now producing 13,000 barrels per day (2,100 m^{3}/d), and probable reserves have rocketed to more than 400 million barrels from 60 million.

— Christopher Cooper, The Wall Street Journal

However, Richard Heinberg provides his own figures:

Production from Eugene Island had achieved 20,000 barrels per day (3,200 m^{3}/d) by 1989; by 1992 it had slipped to 15,000 bbl/d (2,400 m^{3}/d), but recovered to reach a peak of 30,000 bbl/d (4,800 m^{3}/d) in 1996. Production from the reservoir has dropped steadily since then.

— Richard Heinberg, Energy Bulletin

The source of additional oil was analyzed as migrating through faults from deeper and older formations below the probable Jurassic and Early Cretaceous age. The oil contains biomarkers closely related to other very old oils which were long trapped in deep formations.

Eugene Island 330's fame comes from its status as an unusual anomaly. Most petroleum scientists believe that the depletion profile is adequately explained by replenishment from deeper reservoirs of normal biologically derived petroleum.

== Production and ownership ==
As of 1987 June 30 the cumulative production of Eugene Island 330 was 481 million barrels (76.5×10^{6} m^{3}) of oil equivalent, which is equivalent to an average of about 82,000 barrels per day (13,000 m^{3}/d), taking 1971 as start of production. Oil and condensate production alone totaled 271 million barrels (43.1×10^{6} m^{3}) with a maximum daily production of 95,290 barrels per day (15,150 m^{3}/d) in 1977. Oil is exported through the Shell Pipeline Co LP operated Eugene Island Pipeline System.

As of 1999 the owners of the block leases (numbers in parentheses) are Chevron Corporation (313), Royal Dutch Shell (331), Ecee, Inc (330), Palo Petroleum (337). As of 2010 Arena Offshore / Chevron Corporation joint venture RIKER (338). As of 2011 Arena Offshore (314).
