= Flat spot (disambiguation) =

Flat spot is a rail transport fault.

Flat spot may also refer to:

- Flat spot (automobile), one of two possible automobile faults
- Flat spot (reflection seismology), a reflection seismology attribute anomaly
