= Polarity reversal (seismology) =

Drastic change in a seismic attribute, indicative of hydrocarbons

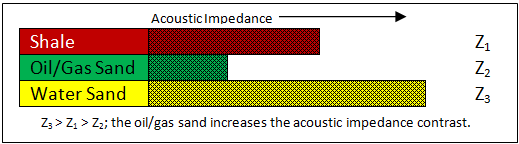
Diagram showing the acoustic relationship that results in a seismic polarity reversal.

In reflection seismology, a polarity reversal or phase change is a local amplitude seismic attribute anomaly that can indicate the presence of hydrocarbons and is therefore known as a direct hydrocarbon indicator. It primarily results from the change in polarity of the seismic response when a shale (with a lower acoustic impedance) overlies a brine-saturated zone (with a high acoustic impedance), that becomes invaded with an oil/gas sand (with the lowest acoustic impedance of the three). This changes the acoustic impedance contrast from an increase to a decrease, resulting in the polarity of the seismic response being reversed - as per the normal convention adopted by the SEG.

== Occurrence ==
For a polarity reversal to occur, the shale has to have a lower acoustic impedance than the water sand and both are required to have a higher acoustic impedance than the oil/gas sand. This is the intermediate situation, that occurs during sediment compaction with depth, between the acoustic impedance relationship required for a bright spot and the acoustic impedance relationship required for a dim spot.
