= Seismic data acquisition =

Stage of seismic exploration

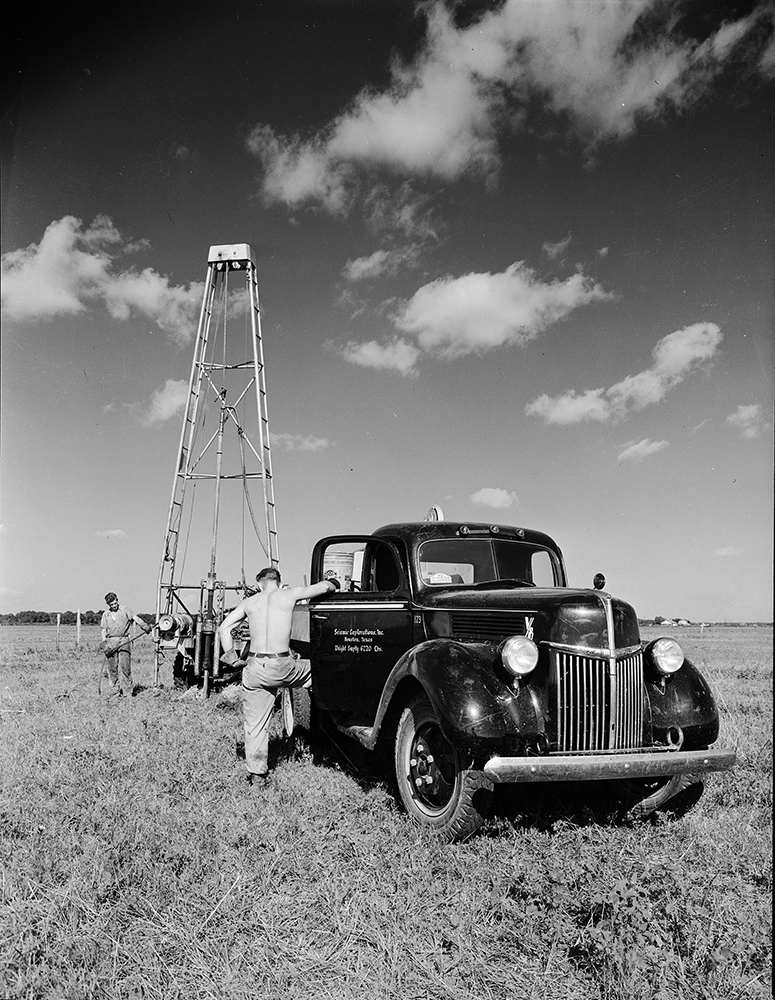
Workers performing seismic tests (US, 1940s)

Seismic data acquisition is the first of the three distinct stages of seismic exploration, the other two being seismic data processing and seismic interpretation. Seismic acquisition requires the use of a seismic source at specified locations for a seismic survey, and the energy that travels within the subsurface as seismic waves generated by the source gets recorded at specified locations on the surface by what are known as receivers (geophones or hydrophones).

Before seismic data can be acquired, a seismic survey needs to be planned, a process which is commonly referred to as the survey design. This process involves the planning regarding the various survey parameters used, e.g. source type, receiver type, source spacing, receiver spacing, number of source shots, number of receivers in a receiver array (i.e. group of receivers), number of receiver channels in a receiver spread, sampling rate, record length (the specified time for which the receiver actively records the seismic signal) etc. With the designed survey, seismic data can be recorded in the form of seismic traces, also known as seismograms, which directly represent the "response of the elastic wavefield to velocity and density contrasts across interfaces of layers of rock or sediments as energy travels from a source through the subsurface to a receiver or receiver array."

== Survey parameters ==
=== Source types for land acquisition ===
For land acquisition, different types of sources may be used depending on the acquisition settings.

Explosive sources such as dynamite are the preferred seismic sources in rough terrains, in areas with high topographic variability or in environmentally sensitive areas e.g. marshes, farming fields, mountainous regions etc. Such type of sources needs to be buried (coupled) into the ground in order to maximize the amount of seismic energy transferred into the subsurface as well as to minimize safety hazards during its detonation. An advantage of explosive sources is that the seismic signal (known as the seismic wavelet) is minimum phase i.e. most of the wavelet's energy is focused at its onset and therefore during seismic processing, the wavelet has an inverse that is stable and causal and hence can be used in attempts to remove (deconvolve) the original wavelet. A significant disadvantage of using explosive sources is that the source/seismic wavelet is not exactly known and reproducible and therefore the vertical stacking of seismograms or traces from these individual shots can lead to sub-optimal results (i.e. the signal-to-noise ratio is not as high as desired). Additionally, the seismic wavelet cannot be precisely removed to yield spikes or impulses (the ideal aim is the dirac delta function) corresponding to reflections on seismograms. A factor that contributes to the varying nature of the seismic wavelets corresponding to explosive sources is the fact that with each explosion at the prescribed locations, the subsurface's physical properties near the source get altered; this consequently results in changes in the seismic wavelet as it passes by these regions.

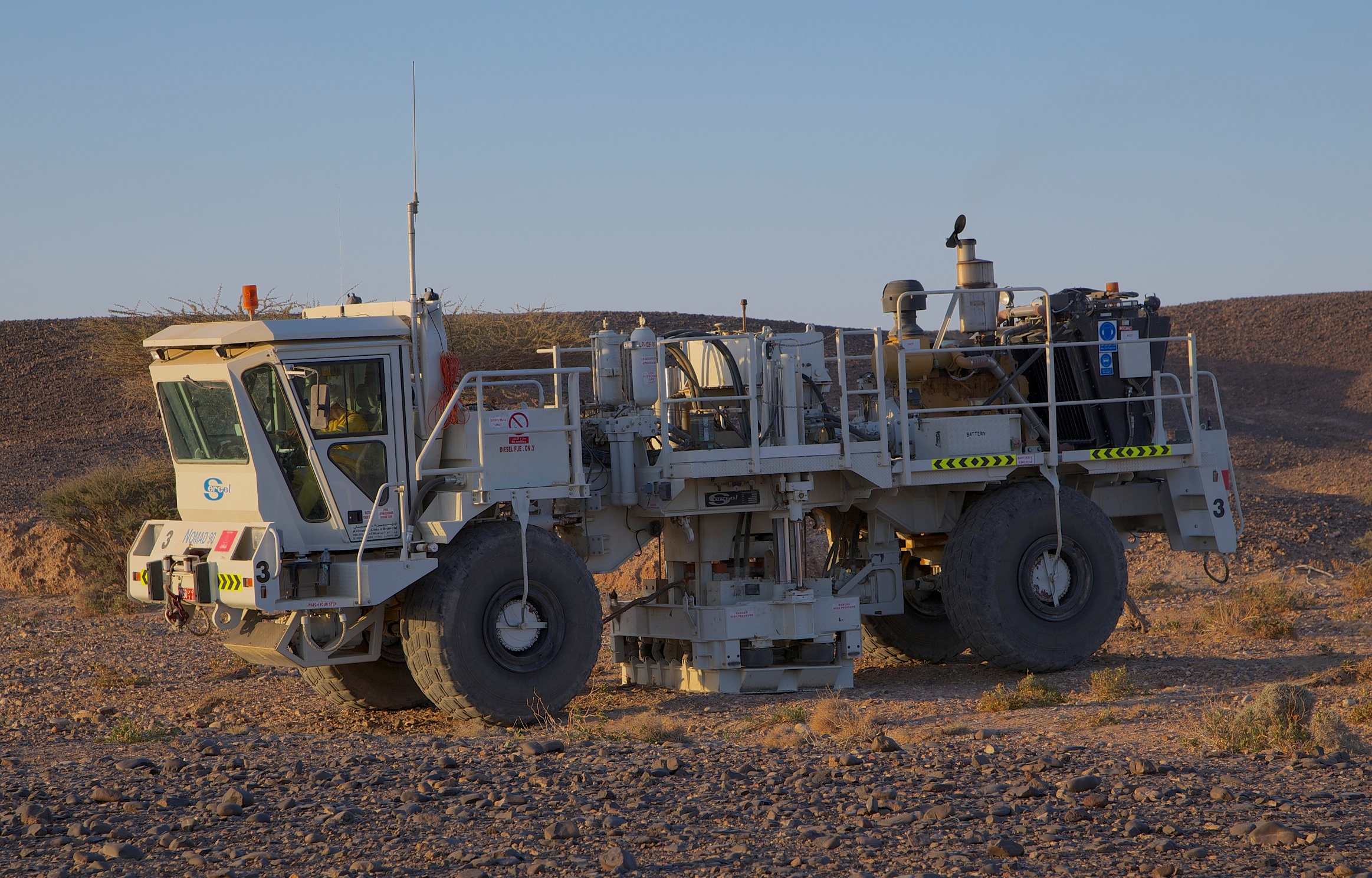
Nomad 90 vibrating

Vibratory sources (also known as Vibroseis) are the most commonly used seismic sources in the oil and gas industry. An aspect that sets this type of source apart from explosives or other sources is that it offers direct control over the seismic signal transmitted into the subsurface i.e. energy can be transmitted into the subsurface over a known range of frequencies over a specified period of time. Vibratory sources typically consist of trucks fitted with heavy plates, which are lowered firmly onto the ground and vibrated to transmit seismic energy to the subsurface. The figure on the right shows one such Vibroseis, known as the Nomad 90. Vibratory sources are often employed where vast areas need to be explored and where the acquisition region does not feature densely populated or densely vegetated areas; highly varying topography also inhibits the employment of vibratory sources. Additionally, wet regions are also suboptimal for vibratory source use since these trucks are extremely heavy and hence tend to damage property in wet terrains.

Weight Drop sources, such as the hammer source, are simpler seismic sources that are typically employed for near-surface seismic refraction surveys. This type of source often only involves a weight source (e.g. hammer) and a plate (alongside a trigger to initiate recording on receivers) and hence is logistically feasible at most locations. Its usage mainly being in the near-surface surveys is associated with the smaller amplitudes generated and hence smaller penetration depths compared to vibratory and explosive sources. As in the case of explosive sources, weight drop sources also utilize an unknown source wavelet which offers difficulty in optimal vertical stacking and deconvolution.

=== Source types for marine acquisition ===
Air-gun is the most commonly used seismic source in marine seismic acquisition since the 1970s. The air-gun is a chamber that is filled with highly pressurized, compressed air which is rapidly released into the water to generate an acoustic pulse (signal). The factors contributing to its common use include the fact that the pulses generated are predictable, controllable and hence repeatable. Additionally, it uses air to generate the source which is readily available and free of cost. Lastly, it also has a relatively smaller environmental impact for marine life compared to other marine seismic sources; an aspect that deters the use of vibratory sources for marine acquisition. Air-guns are typically used in groups or arrays (i.e. multiple air-guns of different volumes) to maximise the signal-to-noise ratio and to minimise the appearance of bubble pulses or oscillations on the traces.

=== Receiver type ===
==== Hydrophone ====
A hydrophone is a seismic receiver that is typically used in marine seismic acquisition, and it is sensitive to changes in pressure caused by acoustic pulses in its surrounding environment. Typical hydrophones utilise piezoelectric transducers that, when subjected to changes in pressure, produce an electric potential which is directly indicative of pressure changes. As is the case with air-guns, hydrophones are often also employed in groups or arrays which consist of multiple hydrophones wired collectively to ensure maximum signal-to-noise ratio.

==== Geophone ====
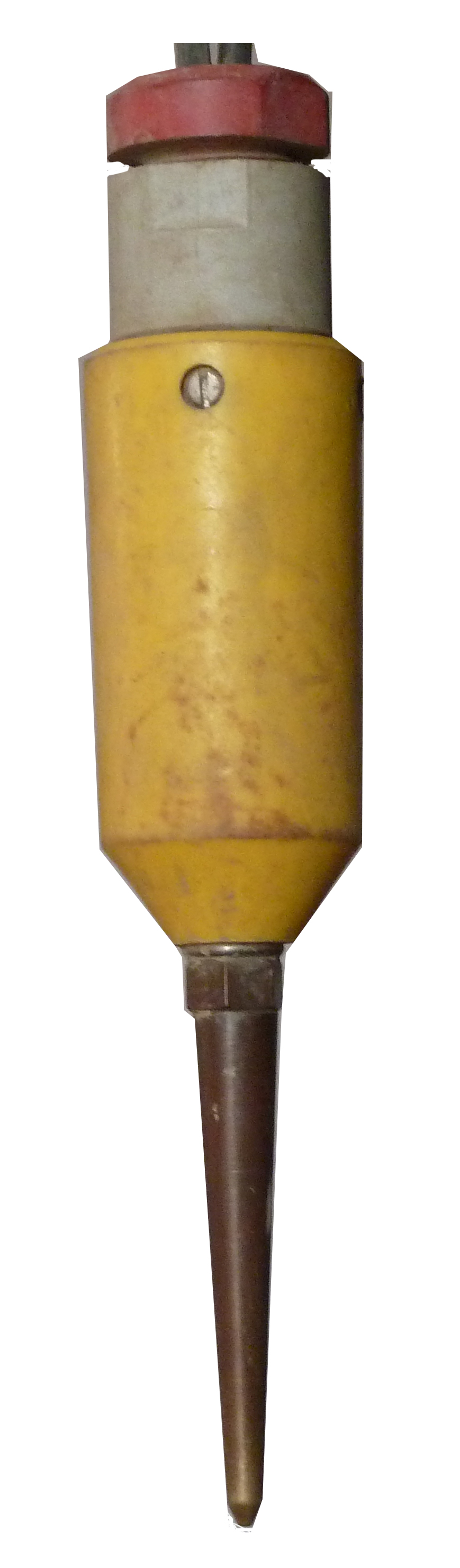
Geophone SM-24

A geophone is a seismic receiver that is often chosen in land acquisition to monitor the particle velocity in a certain orientation. A geophone can either be a single-component geophone which is designed to record p-waves (compressional waves), or it can be a multi-component geophone designed to record p-waves and s-waves (shear waves). Geophones require sufficiently strong coupling with the ground to record the true ground motion initiated by the seismic signal. This is of considerable importance for higher frequency components of the seismic signals, which can be altered substantially with respect to their phase and amplitude due to poor coupling. In the figure on the right, a geophone is shown; the conical spike on the geophone is dug into the ground for coupling. As is the case with hydrophones, geophones are often arranged in arrays as well to maximise the signal-to-noise ratio as well as to minimise the influence of surface waves on recorded data.

=== Sampling interval and Nyquist criterion ===
The seismic signal that needs to be recorded by the receivers is inherently continuous and hence needs to be discretised. The rate at which this continuous signal is discretised is referred to as the sampling interval or sampling rate (see Sampling (signal processing) for more details). According to the Nyquist criterion, the frequency with which the seismic signal needs to be sampled should be at least equal to or greater than twice the maximum frequency component of the signal i.e. f_{sample} ≥ 2f_{max,signal}. The challenge that remains is that the highest frequency component is usually not known during acquisition to be able to calculatedly determine the sampling rate. Therefore, estimates need to be made of the highest possible frequencies contained within the signal; usually, sampling rates higher than these estimates are preferred to ensure that temporal aliasing does not occur.

=== Record length ===
Despite the term length, the record length refers to the time duration (typically listed in milliseconds) over which the receivers are active, recording and storing the seismic response of the subsurface. This recording time should usually start slightly before the source is initiated to ensure that the direct waves are received as the first arrivals on the near-offset receivers. Additionally, the record length should be long enough to ensure that the latest expected arrivals are recorded. Typically, for deeper exploration surveys, the record length is adjusted to the order of multiple seconds (6 seconds is common). 15 to 20 seconds is common for deep crustal exploration. Since the recorded traces can always be clipped for later arrivals during data processing, the record length is normally preferred longer than necessary rather than shorter.
