= Seismic oceanography =

Seismic oceanography is a form of acoustic oceanography, in which sound waves are used to study the physical properties and dynamics of the ocean. It provides images of changes in the temperature and salinity of seawater. Unlike most oceanographic acoustic imaging methods, which use sound waves with frequencies greater than 10,000 Hz, seismic oceanography uses sound waves with frequencies lower than 500 Hz. Use of low-frequency sound means that seismic oceanography is unique in its ability to provide highly detailed images of oceanographic structure that span horizontal distances of hundreds of kilometres and which extend from the sea surface to the seabed. Since its inception in 2003, seismic oceanography has been used to image a wide variety of oceanographic phenomena, including fronts, eddies, thermohaline staircases, turbid layers and cold methane seeps. In addition to providing spectacular images, seismic oceanographic data have given quantitative insight into processes such as movement of internal waves and turbulent mixing of seawater.

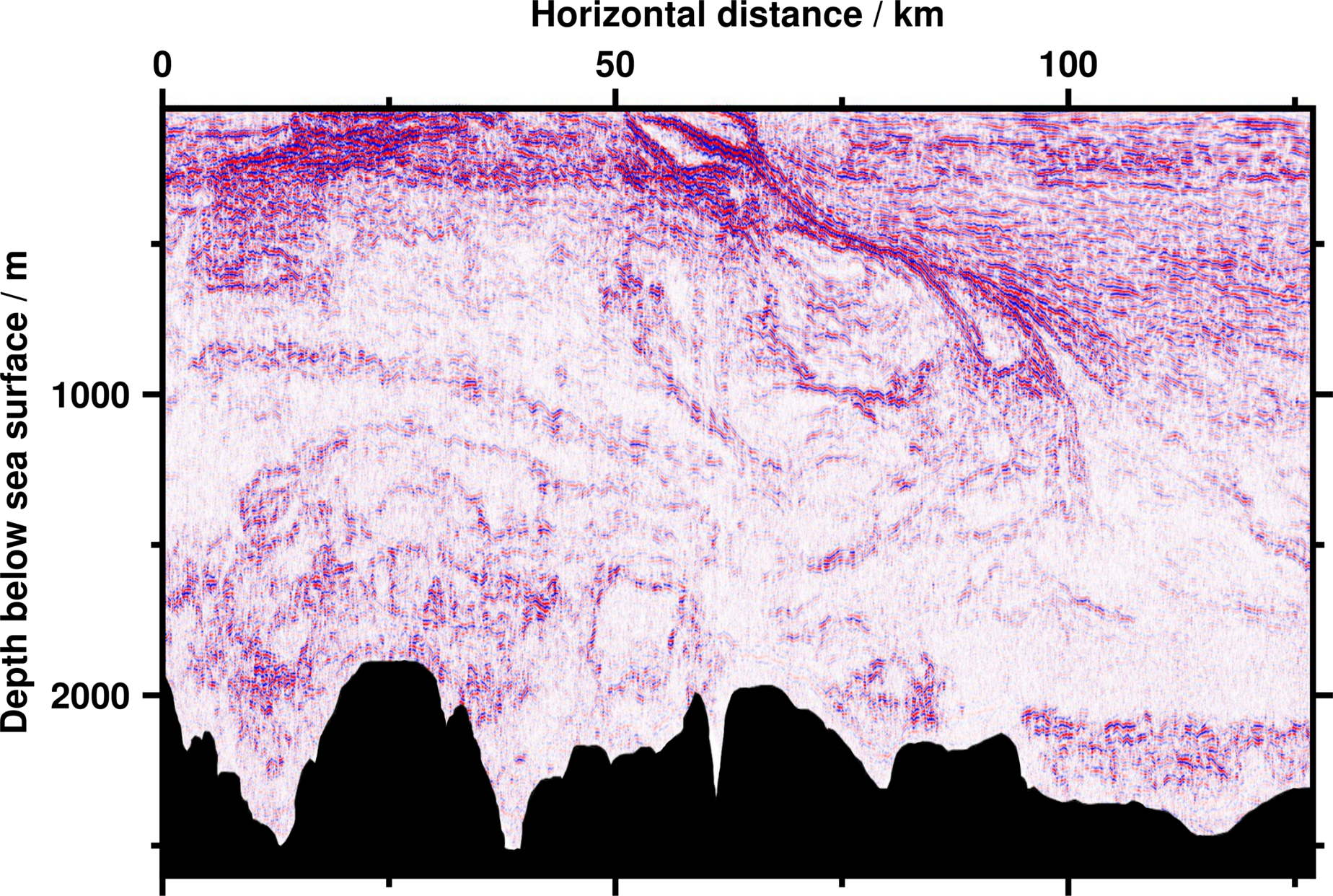
Example seismic oceanographic image showing an oceanic front at the Brazil-Malvinas Confluence in the Atlantic Ocean. Bright red and blue colours correspond to strong changes in oceanic temperature and/or salinity. The black region denotes solid rock beneath the seabed. The image has a resolution on the order of ten meters in the horizontal and vertical directions.

== Method ==
=== Data acquisition ===
Seismic oceanography is based on marine seismic reflection profiling, in which a ship tows specialised equipment for generating underwater sound. This equipment is known as the acoustic source. The ship also tows one or more cables along which are arranged hundreds of hydrophones, which are instruments for recording underwater sound. These cables are referred to as streamers, and are between a few hundred metres and 10 km in length. Both the acoustic source and the streamers lie a few metres beneath the sea surface.

The acoustic source generates sound waves once every few seconds by releasing either compressed air or electrical charge into the sea. Most of these sound waves travel downwards towards the seabed, and a small fraction of the sound is reflected from boundaries at which the temperature or salinity of seawater changes (these boundaries are known as thermohaline boundaries). The hydrophones detect these reflected sound waves. As the ship moves forwards, the positions of the acoustic source and hydrophones change with respect to the reflecting boundaries. Over a period of 30 minutes or less, multiple different configurations of acoustic source and hydrophones sample the same point on a boundary.

=== Image creation ===
==== Idealised case ====
Seismic data record how the intensity of sound at each hydrophone changes with time. The time at which reflected sound arrives at a particular hydrophone depends on the horizontal distance between the hydrophone and the acoustic source, on the depth and shape of the reflecting boundary, and on the speed of sound in seawater. The depth and shape of the boundary and the local speed of sound, which can vary between approximately 1450 m/s and 1540 m/s, are initially unknown. By analysing records from multiple different configurations of acoustic source and hydrophones, the speed of sound can be estimated. Using this estimated speed, the boundary depth is determined under the assumption that the boundary is horizontal. The effects of reflection from boundaries that are not horizontal can be accounted for using methods which are collectively known as seismic migration. After migration, different records that sample the same point on a boundary are added together to increase the signal-to-noise ratio (this process is known as stacking). Migration and stacking are carried out at every depth and at every horizontal position to make a spatially accurate seismic image.

==== Complications ====
The intensity of sound recorded by hydrophones can change due to causes other than reflection of sound from thermohaline boundaries. For instance, the acoustic source produces some sound waves that travel horizontally along the streamer, rather than downwards towards the seabed. Aside from sound produced by the acoustic source, the hydrophones record background noise caused by natural processes such as breaking of wind waves at the ocean surface. These other, unwanted sounds are often much louder than sound reflected from thermohaline boundaries. Use of signal-processing filters quiets unwanted sounds and increases the signal-to-noise ratio of reflections from thermohaline boundaries.

=== Analysis ===
The key advantage of seismic oceanography is that it provides high-resolution (up to 10 m) images of oceanic structure, that can be combined with quantitative information about the ocean. The imagery can be used to identify the length, width, and height of oceanic structures across a range of scales. If the seismic data is also 3D, then the evolution of the structures over time can be analyzed too.

==== Inverting for temperature and salinity ====
Combined with its imagery, processed seismic data can be used to extract other quantitative information about the ocean. So far, seismic oceanography has been used to extract distributions of temperature, and salinity, and therefore density and other important properties. There is a range of approaches that can be used to extract this information. For example, Paramo and Holbrook (2005) extracted temperature gradients in the Norwegian Sea using the Amplitude Versus Offset methods. The distributions of physical properties were limited to one-dimension however. More recently, there has been a move toward two-dimensional technique. Cord Papenberg et al. (2010) presented high-resolution two-dimensional temperature and salinity distributions. These fields were derived using an iterative inversion that combines seismic and physical oceanographic data. Since then, more complex inversions have been presented that are based on Monte Carlo inversion techniques, amongst others.

==== Spectral analysis for vertical mixing rates ====
Aside from temperature and salinity distributions, seismic data of the ocean can also be used to extract mixing rates through spectral analysis. This process is based on the assumption that reflections, which show undulations at a number of scales, track the internal wave field. Therefore, the vertical displacement of these undulations can give a measure of the vertical mixing rates of the ocean. This technique was first developed using data from the Norwegian Sea and showed the enhancement of internal wave energy close to the continental slope. Since 2005, the techniques have been further developed, adapted, and automated so that any seismic section may be converted into a two-dimensional distribution of mixing rates
