= Richard Majeski =

American physicist

Richard Peter Majeski (born March 14, 1952) is an American physicist from the Princeton Plasma Physics Laboratory. He earned his bachelor's (1973) and master's (1974) degrees from the University of Scranton and his PhD in physics from Dartmouth College (1979).

He was awarded the status of Fellow in the American Physical Society, after they were nominated by their Division of Plasma Physics in 2007, for fundamental studies of radio-frequency heating and plasma-wall interactions, including the first observation of Alfvén wave heating in a tokamak, the first demonstration of mode-conversion current drive, and pioneering work in the use of liquid lithium as a plasma-facing component.

== See also ==
- List of fellows of the American Physical Society (1998–2010)
