= Hydrocarbon indicator =

Anomalous seismic attribute due to the presence of a petroleum reservoir

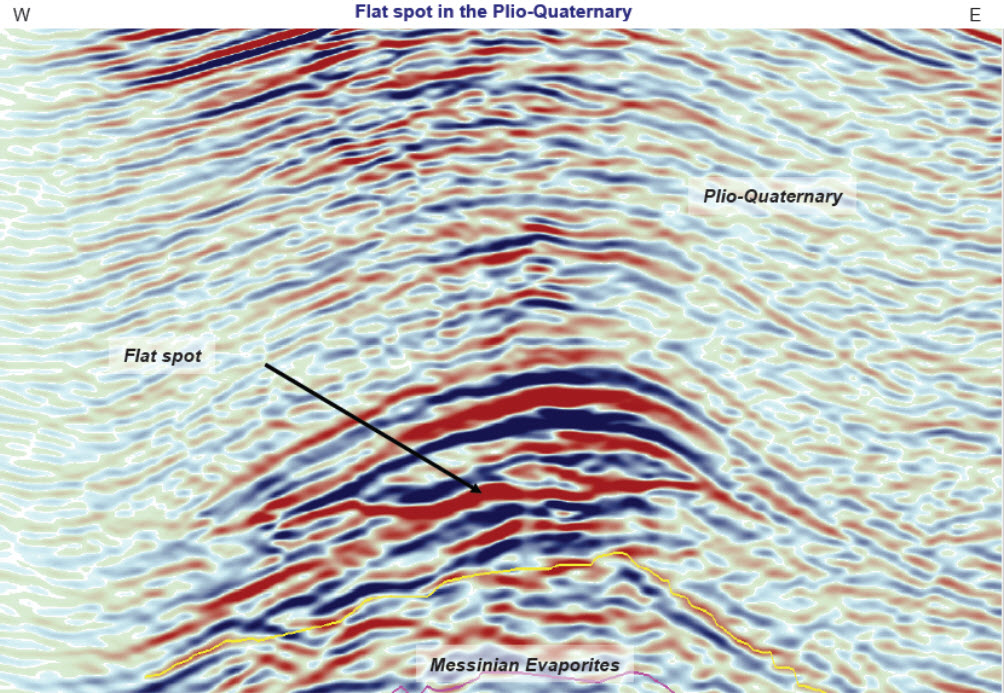
2D seismic line

In reflection seismology, a hydrocarbon indicator (HCI) or direct hydrocarbon indicator (DHI) is an anomalous seismic attribute value or pattern that could be explained by the presence of hydrocarbons in an oil or gas reservoir.

DHIs are particularly useful in hydrocarbon exploration for reducing the geological risk of exploration wells. Broadly, geophysicists recognize several types of DHI:

- Bright spots: localized amplitudes of greater magnitude than background amplitude values. Equipment prior to the 1970s had the bright spots obscured due to the automatic gain control.
- Flat spots: nearly horizontal reflectors that cross existing stratigraphy, possibly indicating a hydrocarbon fluid level within an oil or gas reservoir.
- Dim spots: low amplitude anomalies.
- Polarity reversals can occur where the capping rock has a slightly lower seismic velocity than the reservoir and the reflection has its sign reversed.

Seismic attribute is considered a direct hydrocarbon indicator as it is used to predict reservoir fluid and lithology directly from seismic data. Some geoscientists regard amplitude versus offset anomalies as a type of direct hydrocarbon indicator. For example, the amplitude of a reflection might increase with the angle of incidence, a possible indicator of natural gas.
