= Crossplot =

Crossplot may refer to:

- Cross-plot, a specialized chart
- Crossplot (film), a 1969 thriller starring Roger Moore
