= Tavernor Knott =

British painter (1816–1890)

Tavernor Knott WSA (occasionally written Taverner Knott) (12 May 1816 – 25 January 1900) was a Scottish portrait and genre painter. He was the paternal uncle of Cargill Gilston Knott.

== Life ==
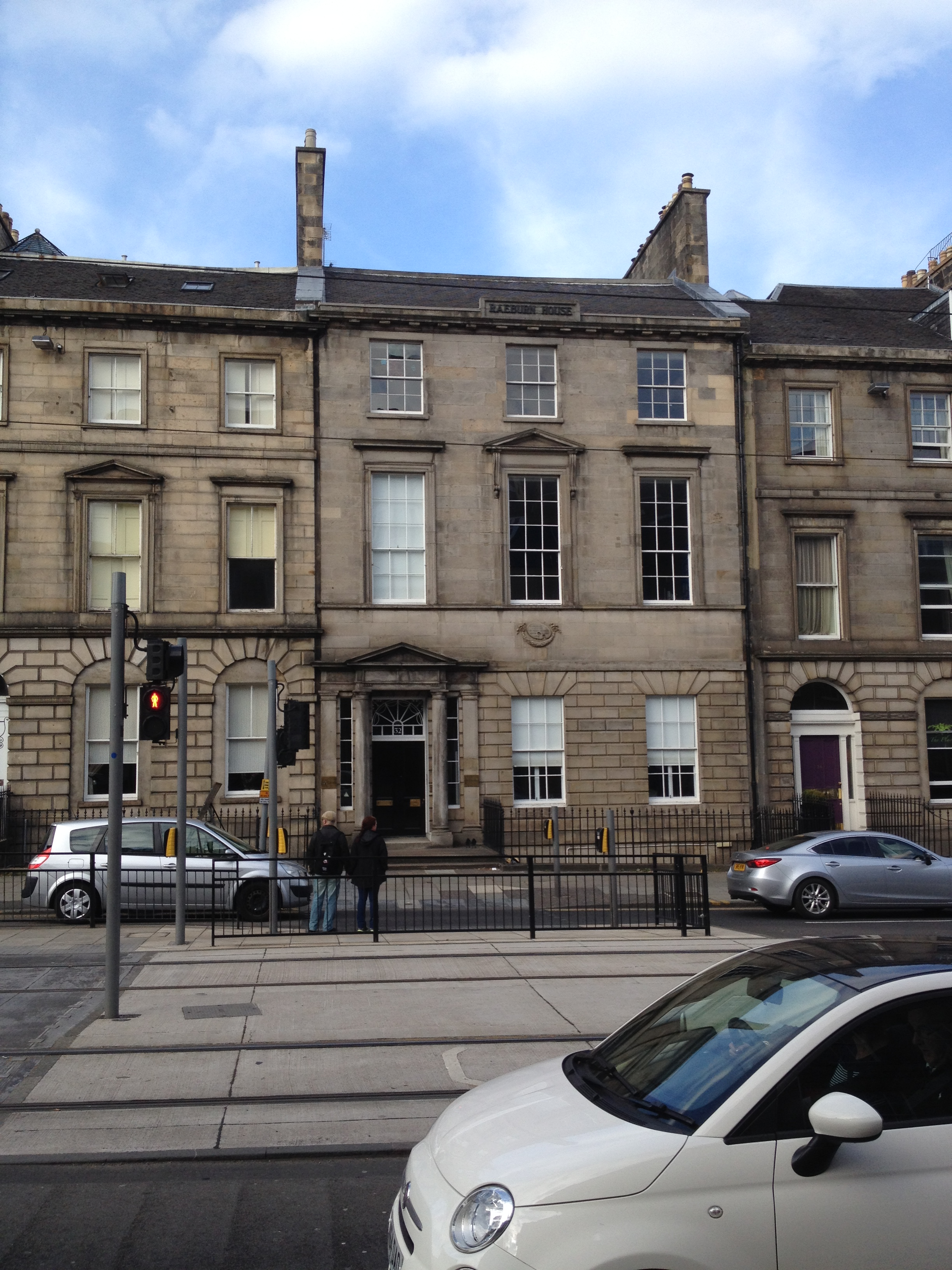
32 York Place, Edinburgh

He was born in Aberdeen in 1816 the son of John Knott (b.1754), a music teacher, and his wife Sophia Pelham. His family (including a sister Sophia M. Knott and brother Tavernor Knott) appear to have moved to 2 St Patrick Square in Edinburgh around 1830.

In 1839 Knott is listed as a portrait painter living at 2 St Patrick Square in Edinburgh's South Side. As the main householder it must be presumed that his father was now dead. On 3 May 1878 he is listed as a Master Mason of the Humber Lodge, at that date being affiliated also as a member of the Celtic Lodge (2 Brodie's Close on the Lawnmarket). On 1 December 1879 a page in William Gladstone’s diary indicates that he wrote to Tavernor Knott from Taymouth Castle shortly before visiting Edinburgh. This appears to have led to a commission as a portrait of Gladstone is amongst his known works.

In later life Tavernor's address was 32 York Place in Edinburgh's First New Town. He died in Portobello on 25 January, 1900.

== Historical Compositions ==
See

- Settlers in the New World (1841)
- Indian Encounter (1841)
- Scottish Emigrants Halting in the Prairie (1841)
