= James Main Dixon =

Scottish teacher, author, and scholar of the Scots language

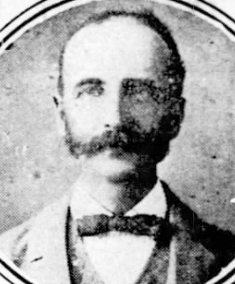
James Main Dixon, 1902

James Main Dixon FRSE (20 April, 1856, Paisley – 27 September 1933) was a Scottish teacher and author, and an important scholar of the Scots language.

== Life ==
He was born in Paisley in Scotland the son of Rev J. M. Dixon.

He graduated MA from the University of St Andrews in 1879, and was appointed scholar and tutor of philosophy there in the same year.

Dixon spent almost 12 years in Japan from 1880 to 1892. He was professor of English and secretary of the Imperial College of Engineering, Tokyo, Japan, from 1879 to 1886, when he was called to the Imperial University of Japan in the same capacity. There he taught Hidesaburo Saito and Natsume Sōseki. While Natsume Sōseki was in the 2nd year of his undergraduate program at Tokyo University Dixon requested him to translate Hōjōki. Later on based on Sōseki's translation Dixon produced a new English translation of this work and also authored an article comparing Kamo no Chomei, the author of Hōjōki and William Wordsworth. Among his other contributions in Japan, he is credited with the rediscovery (together with his friend, Alexander Croft Shaw), of former Nakasendō post town of Karuizawa, and its popularization as a summer resort.

He was elected a Fellow of the Royal Society of Edinburgh in 1885. His proposers were Robert Flint, John Duns, William Swan, and his brother-in-law Cargill Gilston Knott.

From 1892 to 1901 he was professor of English literature in the School of Arts and Sciences at Washington University in St. Louis.

In 1902, when Robert Burns' birthplace was reconstructed at the St. Louis World's Fair, Dixon was made Chairman of the Library and Museum Committee of the Burns Cottage Association. He explained:

I was brought up at Ayr, the Burns neighborhood, and came from an Ayrshire family. My granduncle, John Gray, was town clerk of Ayr and secretary of the great Burns Festival of 1844, when 80,000 good people gathered in a field beside the cottage to honor the name of Ayr's most noted son.

My youth was passed in the place where the 'twa brigs,' the river Doon, Alloway Kirk, Tam O'Shanter Inn, the 'Brig o' Doon' and the Burns cottage and monument are all within a radius of three miles, and you must know that anything pertaining to Burns is indelibly impressed upon me.

In 1903–1904 he was president of Columbia College, in Milton, Oregon. He was professor of English literature at the University of Southern California from 1905 to 1911, when he was transferred to the chair of Oriental studies and comparative literature. In 1906 he became editor of the West Coast Magazine.

In 1908, he received an honorary Doctor of Letters degree from Dickinson College.

He died on 27 September 1933.

== Writings ==
He compiled a Dictionary of Idiomatic English Phrases (1891) and wrote: Twentieth Century Life of John Wesley (1902); "Matthew Arnold," in Modern Poets and Christian Teaching (1906); and A Survey of Scottish Literature in the Nineteenth Century (1907). In 1920, he wrote, The Spiritual Meaning of Tennyson's "In Memoriam" and Manual of Modern Scots.

== Family ==
His sister, Mary Dixon, married Cargill Gilston Knott in 1885.
