= Zoeppritz equations =

Describe the partitioning of seismic wave energy at an interface

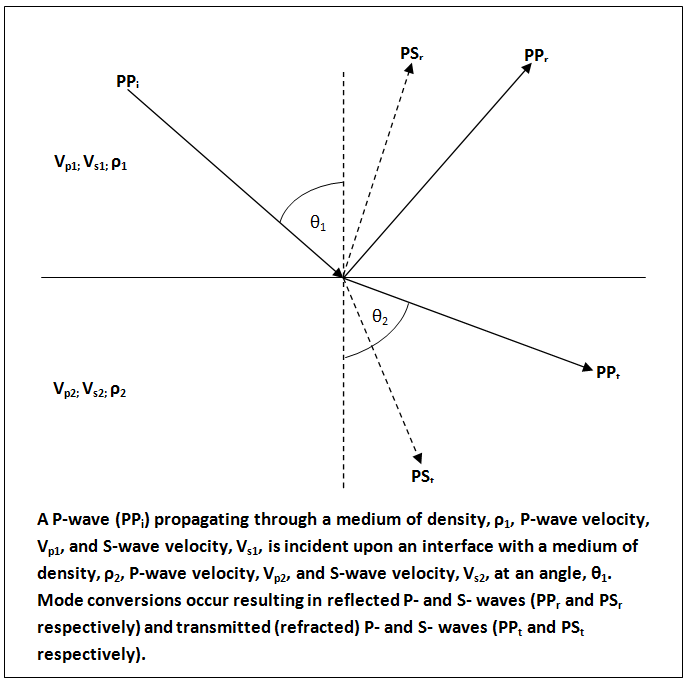
Diagram showing the mode conversions that occur when a P-wave reflects off an interface at non-normal incidence

In geophysics and reflection seismology, the Zoeppritz equations are a set of equations that describe the partitioning of seismic wave energy at an interface, due to mode conversion. They are named after their author, the German geophysicist Karl Bernhard Zoeppritz, who died before they were published in 1919.

The equations are important in geophysics because they relate the amplitude of P-wave, incident upon a plane interface, and the amplitude of reflected and refracted P- and S-waves to the angle of incidence. They are the basis for investigating the factors affecting the amplitude of a returning seismic wave when the angle of incidence is altered — also known as amplitude versus offset analysis — which is a helpful technique in the detection of petroleum reservoirs.

The Zoeppritz equations were not the first to describe the amplitudes of reflected and refracted waves at a plane interface. Cargill Gilston Knott used an approach in terms of potentials almost 20 years earlier, in 1899, to derive Knott's equations. Both approaches are valid, but Zoeppritz's approach is more easily understood.

== Equations ==
The Zoeppritz equations consist of four equations with four unknowns

$$\begin{bmatrix}
R_\mathrm{P} \\
R_\mathrm{S} \\
T_\mathrm{P} \\
T_\mathrm{S} \\
\end{bmatrix}
=
\begin{bmatrix}
-\sin\theta_1 & -\cos\phi_1 & \sin\theta_2& \cos\phi_2 \\
\cos\theta_1 & -\sin\phi_1 & \cos\theta_2 & -\sin\phi_2 \\
\sin 2\theta_1 & \frac{V_\mathrm{P1}}{V_\mathrm{S1}}\cos 2\phi_1 & \frac{\rho_2V_\mathrm{S2}^2 V_\mathrm{P1}}{\rho_1V_\mathrm{S1}^2 V_\mathrm{P2}}\sin2\theta_2 & \frac{\rho_2 V_\mathrm{S2} V_\mathrm{P1}} {\rho_1 V_\mathrm{S1}^2} \cos 2 \phi_2 \\
-\cos 2\phi_1 & \frac{V_\mathrm{S1}}{V_\mathrm{P1}}\sin 2\phi_1 & \frac{\rho_2 V_{P2}}{\rho_1 V_{P1}}\cos 2\phi_2 & -\frac{\rho_2 V_{S2}}{\rho_1V_{P1}}\sin2\phi_2\end{bmatrix}^{-1}
\begin{bmatrix}
\sin\theta_1 \\
\cos\theta_1 \\
\sin 2\theta_1 \\
\cos 2\phi_1 \\
\end{bmatrix}$$

R_{P}, R_{S}, T_{P}, and T_{S}, are the reflected P, reflected S, transmitted P, and transmitted S-wave amplitude coefficients, respectively, ${\theta}_{1}$=angle of incidence, ${\theta}_{2}$=angle of the transmitted P-wave, ${\phi}_{1}$=angle of reflected S-wave and ${\phi}_{2}$=angle of the transmitted S-wave. Inverting the matrix form of the Zoeppritz equations give the coefficients as a function of angle.

Although the four equations can be solved for the four unknowns, they do not give an intuitive understanding for how the reflection amplitudes vary with the rock properties involved (density, velocity etc.). Several attempts have been made to develop approximations to the Zoeppritz equations, such as Bortfeld's (1961) and Aki & Richards’ (1980), but the most successful of these is the Shuey's, which assumes Poisson's ratio to be the elastic property most directly related to the angular dependence of the reflection coefficient.

=== Shuey equation ===
The 3-term Shuey equation can be written a number of ways, the following is a common form:

$$R(\theta ) = R(0) + G \sin^2 \theta + F ( \tan^2 \theta - \sin^2 \theta )$$

where

$$R(0) = \frac{1}{2} \left ( \frac{\Delta V_\mathrm{P}}{V_\mathrm{P}} + \frac{\Delta \rho}{\rho} \right )$$

and

$G = \frac{1}{2} \frac{\Delta V_\mathrm{P}}{V_\mathrm{P}} - 2 \frac{V^2_\mathrm{S}}{V^2_\mathrm{P}} \left ( \frac{\Delta \rho}{\rho} + 2 \frac{\Delta V_\mathrm{S}}{V_\mathrm{S}} \right )$ ; $F = \frac{1}{2}\frac{\Delta V_\mathrm{P}}{V_\mathrm{P}}$

where ${\theta}$=angle of incidence; ${V_p}$ = P-wave velocity in medium; ${{\Delta}V_p}$ = P-wave velocity contrast across interface;${V_s}$ = S-wave velocity in medium; ${{\Delta}V_s}$ = S-wave velocity contrast across interface; ${{\rho}}$ = density in medium; ${{\Delta}{\rho}}$ = density contrast across interface;

A proposed better approximation of Zoeppritz equations:

$$R(\theta ) = R(0) - A \sin^2 \theta$$

and

$$A = 2 \frac{V^2_\mathrm{S}}{V^2_\mathrm{P}} \left ( \frac{\Delta \rho}{\rho} + 2 \frac{\Delta V_\mathrm{S}}{V_\mathrm{S}}  \right )$$

In the Shuey equation, R(0) is the reflection coefficient at normal incidence and is controlled by the contrast in acoustic impedances. G, often referred to as the AVO gradient, describes the variation of reflection amplitudes at intermediate offsets and the third term, F, describes the behaviour at large angles/far offsets that are close to the critical angle. This equation can be further simplified by assuming that the angle of incidence is less than 30 degrees (i.e. the offset is relatively small), so the third term will tend to zero. This is the case in most seismic surveys and gives the “Shuey approximation”:

$$R(\theta ) = R(0) + G \sin^2 \theta$$

== See also ==
- Amplitude versus offset, a practical application of the phenomenon described by these equations.
- Karl Bernhard Zoeppritz
