= Flat spot (reflection seismology) =

Reflection seismology attribute anomaly

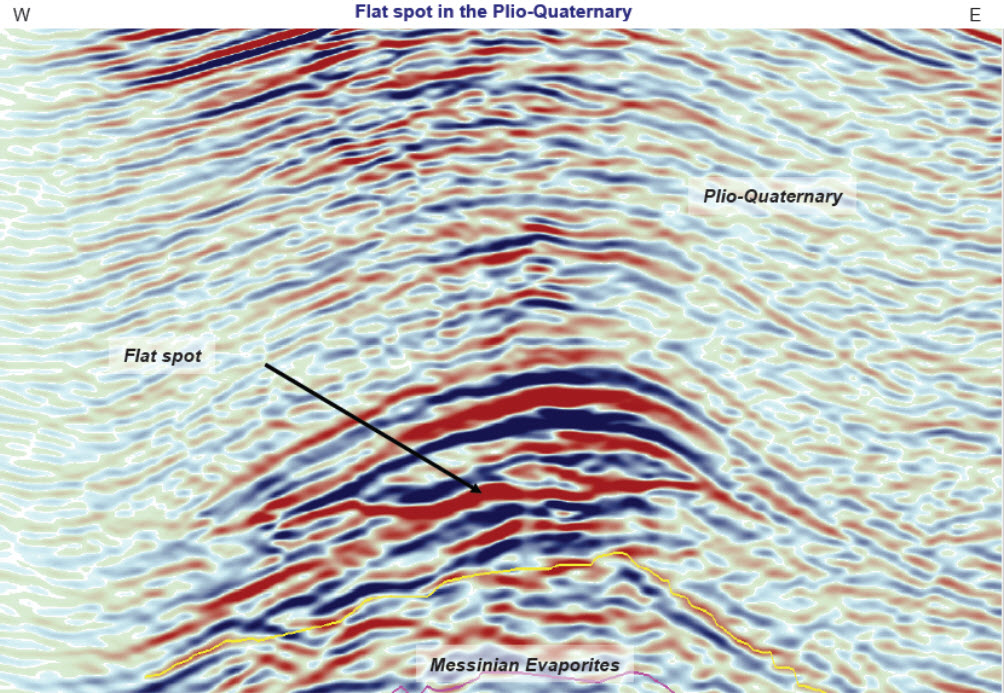
Flat spot in 2D seismic line.

In reflection seismology, a flat spot is a seismic attribute anomaly that appears as a horizontal reflector cutting across the stratigraphy elsewhere present on the seismic image. Its appearance can indicate the presence of hydrocarbons. Therefore, it is known as a direct hydrocarbon indicator and is used by geophysicists in hydrocarbon exploration.

== Theory ==
A flat spot can result from the increase in acoustic impedance when a gas-filled porous rock (with a lower acoustic impedance) overlies a liquid-filled porous rock (with a higher acoustic impedance). It may stand out on a seismic image because it is flat and will contrast with surrounding dipping reflections.

== Caution ==
There are a number of other possible reasons for there being a flat spot on a seismic image. It could be representative of a mineralogical change in the subsurface or an unresolved shallower multiple. Additionally, the interpretation of a flat spot should be attempted after depth conversion to confirm that the anomaly is actually flat.

== See also ==
- Bright spot
- Seismic attribute
- Reflection seismology
