= Seismogram =

Graph output by a seismograph

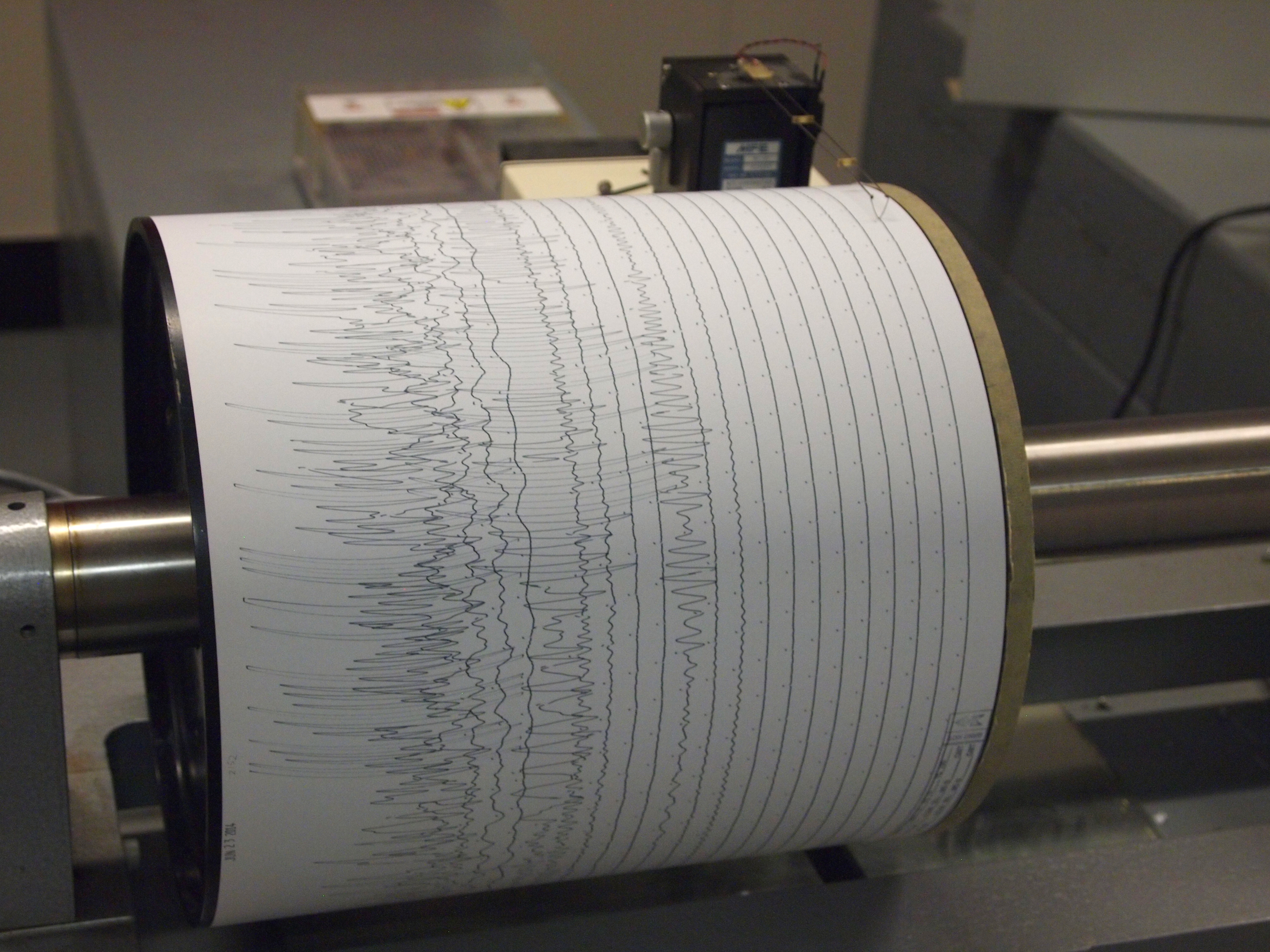
A seismogram being recorded by a seismograph at Weston Observatory in Massachusetts

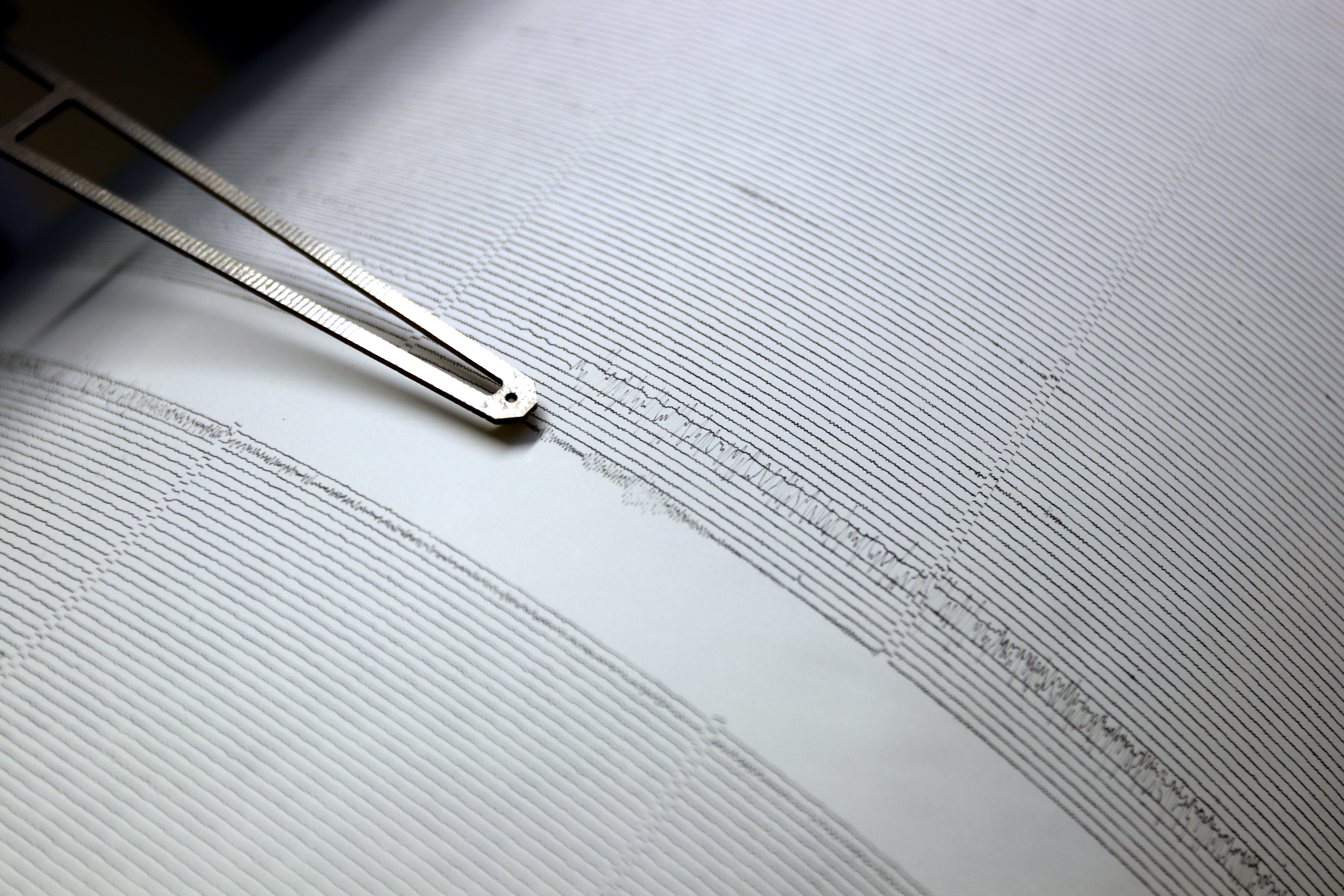
A detail of the seismogram

A seismogram is a graph output by a seismograph. It is a record of the ground motion at a measuring station as a function of time. Seismograms typically record motions in three cartesian axes (x, y, and z), with the z axis perpendicular to the Earth's surface and the x- and y- axes parallel to the surface. The energy measured in a seismogram may result from an earthquake or from some other source, such as an explosion. Seismograms can record many things, and record many little waves, called microseisms. These tiny events can be caused by heavy traffic near the seismograph, waves hitting a beach, the wind, and any number of other ordinary things that cause some shaking of the seismograph.

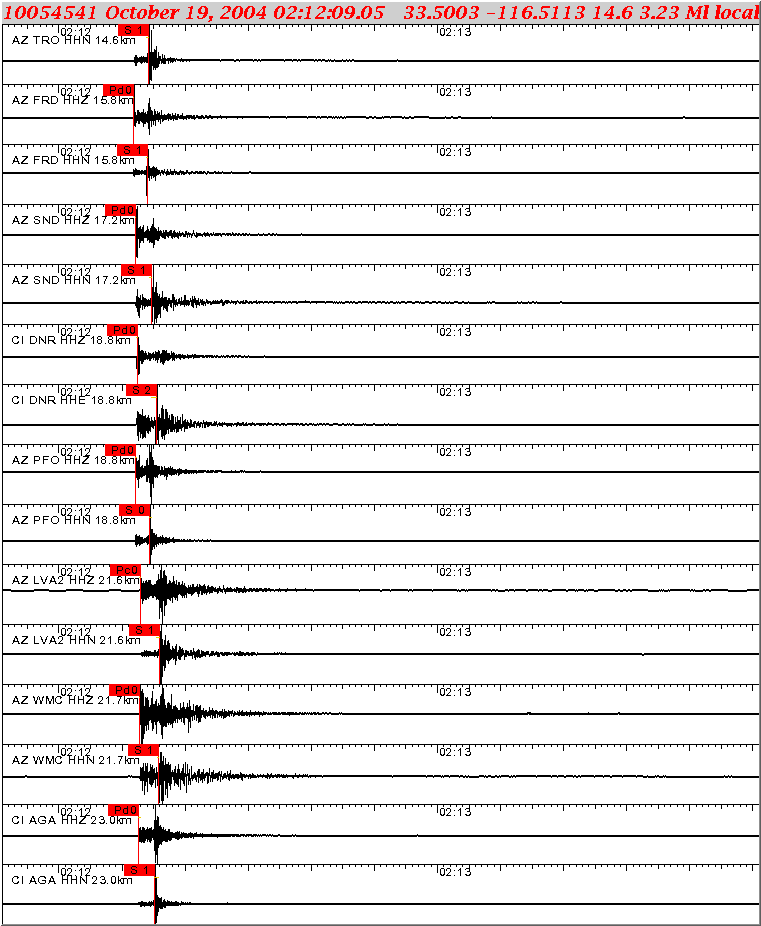
A set of seismograms for an earthquake from the USGS (click to see large version)

Historically, seismograms were recorded on paper attached to rotating drums, a kind of chart recorder. Some used pens on ordinary paper, while others used light beams to expose photosensitive paper. Today, practically all seismograms are recorded digitally to make analysis by computer easier.

== Recording ==
Prior to the availability of digital processing of seismic data in the late 1970s, the records were done in a few different forms on different types of media.

A Helicorder drum is a device used to record data into photographic paper or in the form of paper and ink. A piece of paper is wrapped around a rotating drum of the helicorder which receives the seismic signal from a seismometer. For each predefined interval of data, the helicorder will plot the seismic data in one line before moving to the next line at the next interval. The paper must be changed after the helicorder writes on the last line of the paper. In the model that use ink, regular maintenance of the pen must be done for accurate recording.

A Develocorder is a machine that records multi-channel seismic data into a 16 mm film. The machine was developed by Teledyne Geotech during the mid-1960s. It can automatically plot seismograms from 18 seismic signal sources and 3 time signals on a continuous reel of film. The signals from seismometers are processed by 15.5 Hz recording galvanometers which record the seismograms to a reel of 200 feet (61 m) of film at the speeds between 3 and 20 centimetres (1.2 and 7.9 in) per minute. The machine has self-contained circulating chemicals that are used to automatically develop the film. However, the machine takes at least ten minutes from the time of recording to the time that the film can be viewed.

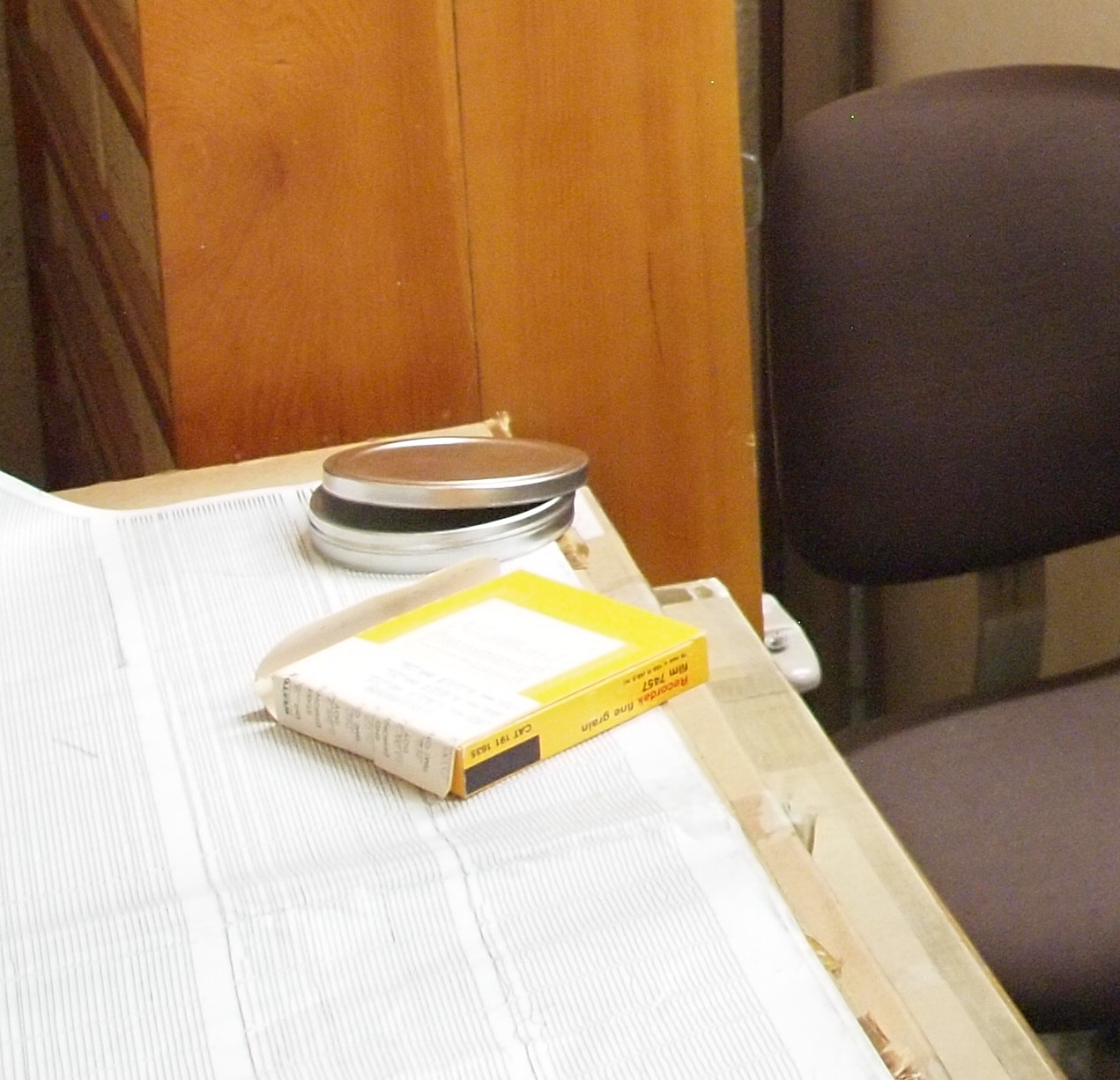
A container that stores a Develocorder film reel

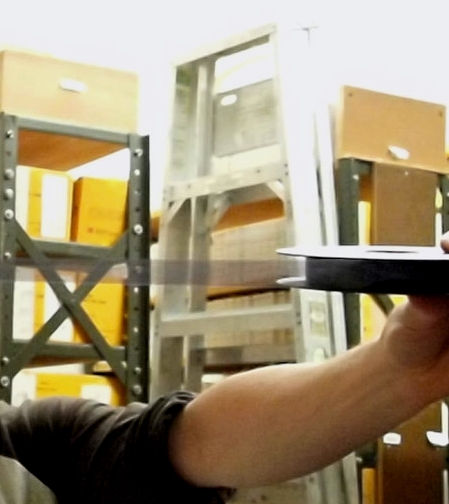
A Develocorder film reel

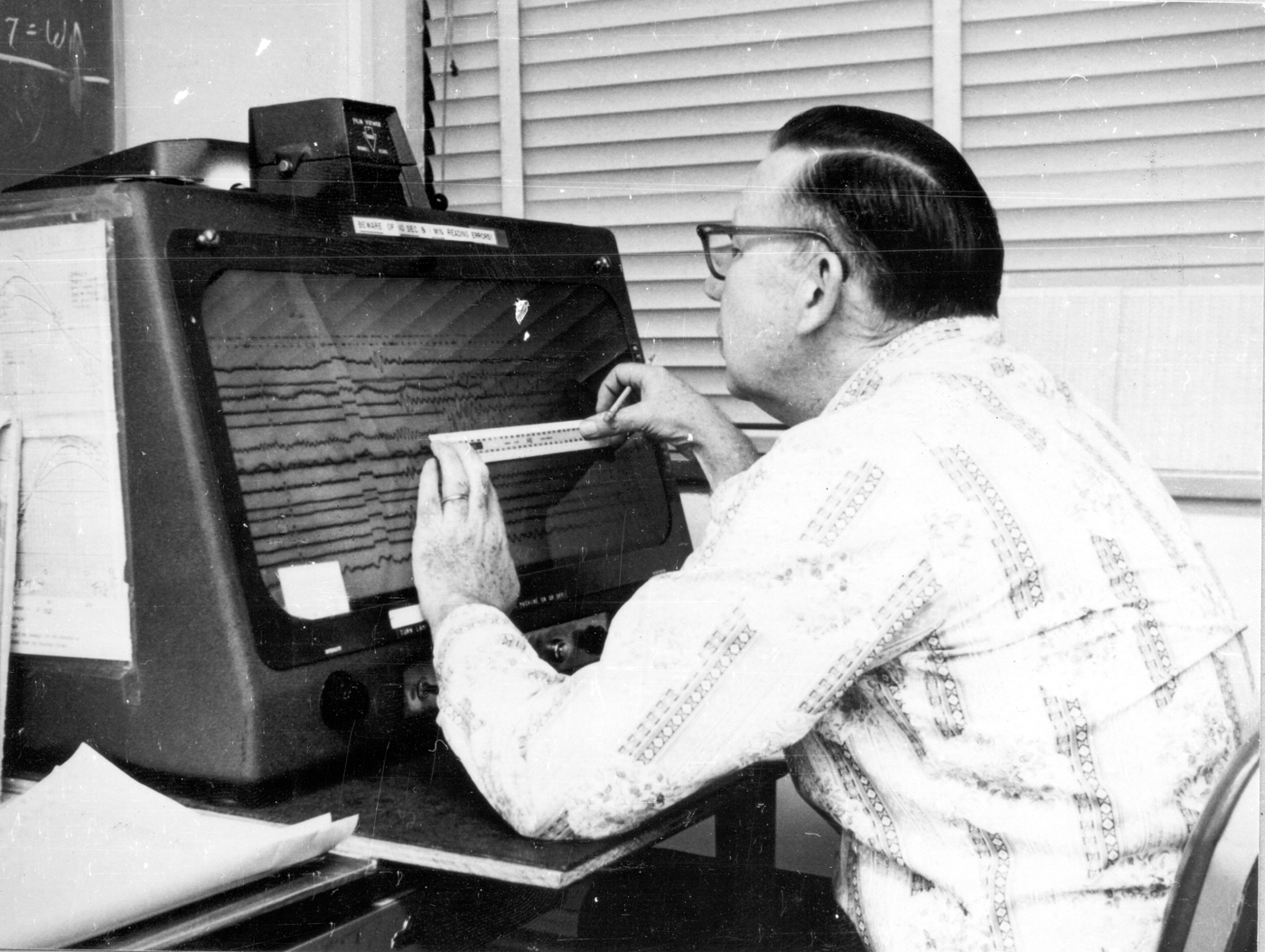
Viewing of a Develocorder film

After the digital processing had been used, the archives of the seismograms were recorded on magnetic tapes. The data from the magnetic tapes can then be read back to reconstruct the original waveforms. Due to the deterioration of older magnetic tape medias, large number of waveforms from the archives in the early digital recording days are not recoverable. Today, many other forms are used to digitally record the seismograms into digital medias.

== See also ==
- Vertical seismic profile
- First break picking
- Linear seismic inversion
