= Mode conversion =

Transformation of a wave at an interface

An incident longitudinal wave (L1) is reflected and transmitted at an interface of two solids as a longitudinal wave (L1' and L2), but also partially as a transverse wave (S1 and S2).

Mode conversion is the transformation of a wave at an interface into other wave types (modes).

== Principle ==
Mode conversion occurs when a wave encounters an interface between materials of different impedances and the incident angle is not normal to the interface. Thus, for example, if a longitudinal wave from a fluid (e.g., water or air) strikes a solid (e.g., steel plate), it is usually refracted and reflected as a function of the angle of incidence, but if some of the energy causes particle movement in the transverse direction, a second transverse wave is generated, which can also be refracted and reflected. Snellius' law of refraction can be formulated as:

$\frac{\sin { \theta }_{1} }{ {V}_{L1} } = \frac{\sin { \theta }_{2} }{ {V}_{L2} } = \frac{\sin { \theta }_{3} }{ {V}_{S1} } = \frac{\sin { \theta }_{4} }{ {V}_{S2} }$

This means that the incident wave is split into two different wave types at the interface. If we consider a wave incident on an interface of two different solids (e.g. aluminum and steel), the wave type of the reflected wave also splits.

Besides these simple mode conversions, an incident wave can also be converted into surface waves. For example, if one radiates a longitudinal wave at a shallower angle than that of total reflection onto a boundary surface, it will be totally reflected, but in addition a surface wave traveling along the boundary layer will be generated. The incident wave is thus converted into reflected longitudinal and surface wave.

In general, mode conversions are not discrete processes, i.e. a part of the incident energy is converted into different types of waves. The amplitudes (transmission factor, reflection factor) of the converted waves depend on the angle of incidence.

== Seismic waves ==
An (longitudinal) P-wave is partially reflected and transmitted (PSt and PPt) as a (transverse) S-wave (PSr) and (longitudinal) P-wave (PPr). The nomenclature is as follows: First letter stands for the wave type of the causal wave (primary wave) and the second letter for the type of secondary waves generated after mode conversion.

In seismology, a wave conversion specifically refers to the conversion between P and S waves at discontinuities. Body waves are reflected and refracted when they hit a boundary layer within the earth. Here, P-waves can be converted into S-waves (PS-wave) at interfaces, as well as vice versa (SP-wave). Here applies analogously for an incident P-wave:

$\frac{\sin { \theta }_{P1} }{ {P}_{1} } = \frac{\sin { \theta }_{P1} }{ {PP}_{r} } = \frac{\sin { \theta }_{P2} }{ {PP}_{t} } = \frac{\sin { \theta }_{S1} }{ {PS}_{r} } = \frac{\sin { \theta }_{S2} }{ {PS}_{t} }$

The change in amplitudes can be described with the zoeppritz equations.
