= Cross-plot =

Example of a cross-plot used in petroleum geology for the interpretation of water saturation and clay content using well log data

A cross-plot, also called crossplot or cross plot, is a type of plot used in Earth science to describe relationships for two or more variables. Most plots referred to as cross-plots are scatter plots, but combinations of different charts and diagrams can be common (e.g. histograms). The axes of the plot are commonly linear, but may also be logarithmic.

Cross-plots are used to interpret geophysical (e.g., amplitude versus offset analysis), geochemical, and hydrologic data.
