= Knott's equations =

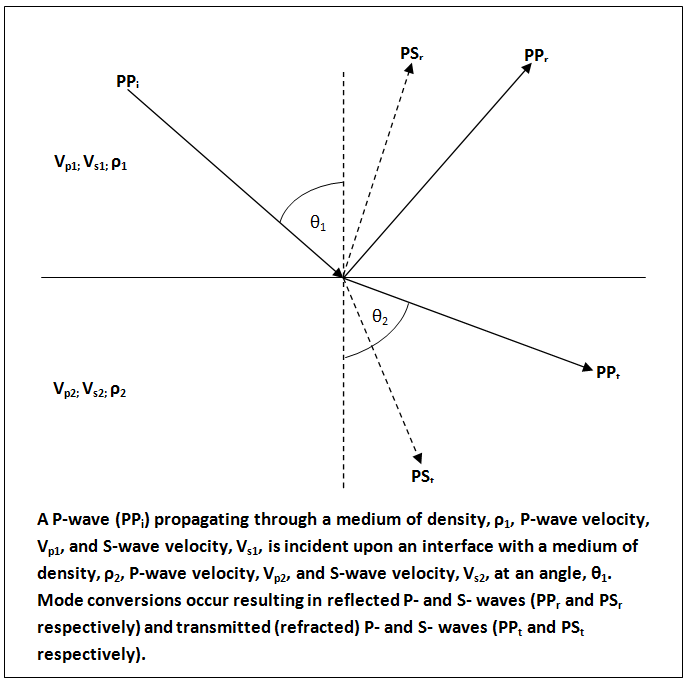
Diagram showing the mode conversions that occur when a P-wave reflects off an interface at non-normal incidence

In geophysics, Knott's equations were the first equations to describe the amplitudes of reflected and refracted waves generated at non-normal incidence upon an interface. They were derived in 1899 by the British geophysicist Cargill Gilston Knott using displacement potential functions and describe the same phenomenon that the Zoeppritz equations describe in terms of amplitude displacements.
