= Cargill Gilston Knott =

Scottish physicist and mathematician (1856–1922)

Cargill Gilston Knott FRS, FRSE
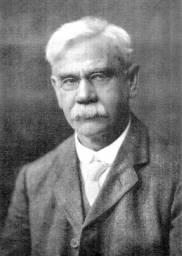
- Born: 30 June 1856; Penicuik, Scotland
- Died: 26 October 1922 (aged 66); Edinburgh, Scotland
- Citizenship: British
- Education: University of Edinburgh
- Occupations: Physicist and mathematician
- Relatives: Tavernor Knott (uncle)
- Awards: Order of the Rising Sun
- Scientific career
- Fields: Physics, mathematics, seismology
- Workplaces: Scotland, Japan

Cargill Gilston Knott FRS, FRSE LLD (30 June 1856 – 26 October 1922) was a Scottish physicist and mathematician who was a pioneer in seismological research. He spent his early career in Japan. He later became a Fellow of the Royal Society, secretary of the Royal Society of Edinburgh, and president of the Scottish Meteorological Society.

== Biography ==
Knott was born in Penicuik, Midlothian, the son of Pelham Knott, an agent for a paper manufacturer, and his wife Ellen. His paternal uncle was the artist Tavernor Knott.

He was educated at Arbroath High School in Angus, and attended the University of Edinburgh, where he studied alongside James Alfred Ewing. Knott worked on various aspects of electricity and magnetism, obtaining his doctorate in 1879.

He was appointed as an assistant in Natural Philosophy at the University of Edinburgh in 1879, and held this post until 1883, when he left to take up a post at Tokyo Imperial University. He was elected as a Fellow of the Royal Society of Edinburgh in 1880 after being proposed by Peter Guthrie Tait, Alexander Crum Brown, John Gray McKendrick, and Alexander Buchan. He won the Society's Keith Prize for the period 1893–95. He served as Secretary 1905-1912 and General Secretary 1912–1922. He was also a founder of the Edinburgh Mathematical Society, taking the chair for its first meeting on Friday 2 February 1883.

== Career in Japan ==
Japan's Ministry of Public Works was founded in October 1871 with 11 departments, one of which was an engineering college. College head Yamao Yōzō invited British scientists William Rankine and Lord Kelvin to send British instructors. Six came, including geologist John Milne and physicist James Alfred Ewing, who became professors at the college, which became part of Tokyo Imperial University.

Ewing returned to Scotland in 1883 and the university rector asked Lord Kelvin to recommend a successor. Kelvin recommended Knott, which was supported by Ewing. Thus, Knott replaced Ewing as Professor of Physics and Engineering at Tokyo Imperial University. For the next nine years, he worked closely with Milne, Gray, and the Japanese seismologist Fusakichi Omori in establishing a network of recording seismometers across the Empire of Japan. Knott also taught courses in mathematics, acoustics, and electromagnetism at the Tokyo Imperial University.

Knott also undertook the first geomagnetic survey of Japan, assisted by Japanese geophysicist Tanakadate Aikitsu, from which was developed the first earthquake hazard map of Japan. Knott's key contribution was his background in mathematics and data analysis. One of his innovations was to apply the technique of Fourier analysis to the occurrence of earthquakes. Two chapters in his 1908 book The Physics of Earthquake Phenomena were devoted to this subject, which Knott hoped would enable him to deduce the probability of when future earthquakes would occur.

Knott married Mary Dixon in 1885, becoming the brother-in-law of the literary scholar James Main Dixon.

On the conclusion of his stay in Japan in 1891, he was awarded the Order of the Rising Sun by Emperor Meiji.

== Return to Edinburgh ==
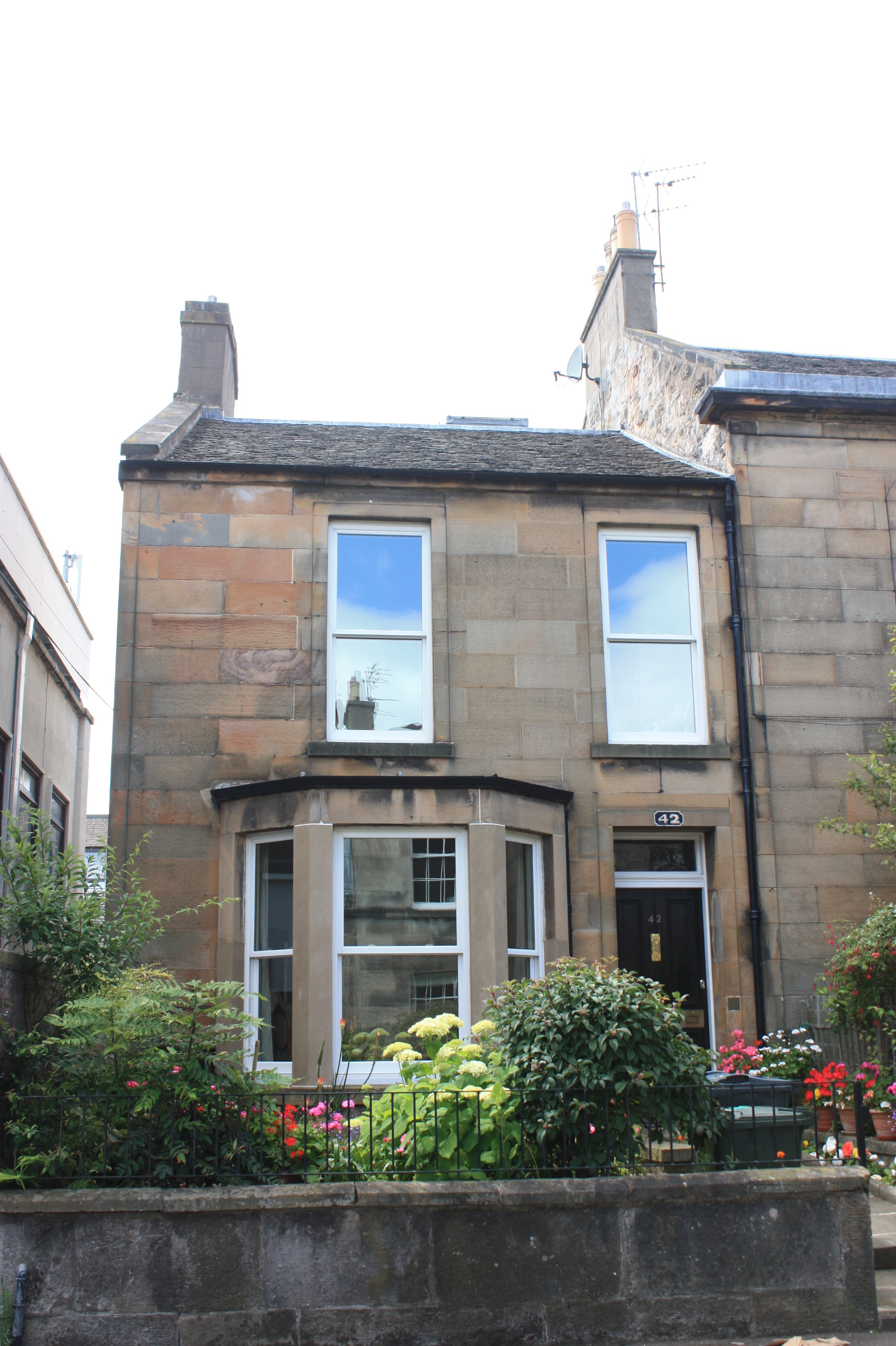
Knott's house at 42 Upper Gray Street, Edinburgh

On his return to Edinburgh, Knott took up the position of a Reader in Applied Mathematics at the University of Edinburgh, holding the post until his death in 1922.

While in Japan, Knott began to develop mathematical equations describing how seismic vibrations are reflected and transmitted across the boundary between seawater and seabed. After returning to the University of Edinburgh in 1892, he expanded upon this research to describe the behaviour of earthquake waves at the interface between two different types of rock.

Knott's equations, derived in terms of potentials, were the first to describe the amplitudes of reflected and refracted waves at non-normal incidence and together with the Zoeppritz equations are now the basis for modern reflection seismology – an important technique in hydrocarbon exploration.

Knott continued his work as a mathematician, including quaternion methods of his professor and mentor Peter Guthrie Tait. When the tight constraints of a single linear algebra began to be felt in the 1890s, and revisionists began publishing, Knott contributed the pivotal article "Recent Innovations in Vector Theory". As Michael J. Crowe describes, this paper set straight wayward theorists that expected to find associativity in systems like hyperbolic quaternions. Knott wrote:

[T]he assumption that the square of a unit vector is positive unity leads to an algebra whose characteristic quantities are non-associative.

Evidently Knott overlooked the existence of the ring of coquaternions. Nevertheless, Crowe states that Knott "wrote with care and thoroughness" and that "only Knott was well acquainted with his opponents system".

For a textbook on quaternions, lecturers and students relied on Tait and Kelland's Introduction to Quaternions which had editions in 1873 and 1882. It fell to Knott to prepare a third edition in 1904. By then the Universal Algebra of Alfred North Whitehead (1898) presumed some grounding in quaternions as students encountered matrix algebra. In Knott's introduction to his textbook edition he says "Analytically the quaternion is now known to take its place in the general theory of complex numbers and continuous groups,...". Thus he was aware of the diversity to be encountered in modern mathematical structures, and that quaternions stand as a milestone on the way to others.

He became more active in the Royal Society of Edinburgh, serving on the council from 1894 to 1905, moving up to a Secretary to Ordinary Meetings in 1905 and finally becoming its general secretary in 1912 until his death in 1922. Knott also took an active social role in his community including Sunday school teaching and church affairs with the United Free Church of Scotland. He was finally elected a Fellow of the Royal Society in 1920 and was also a member of the Scottish Meteorological Society.

He died at his home at 42 Upper Gray Street, Newington, Edinburgh, on 26 October 1922.

== Partial bibliography ==
The internet archive and other web sources now offer some of Knott's works:

- 1890: M. Ballore's Calculations on Earthquake Frequency from Google Books
- 1899: Reflection and Refraction of Elastic Waves with Seismological Applications, Philosophical Magazine 48: 64–97 via Biodiversity Heritage Library
- 1904: (as editor) Introduction to Quaternions, 3rd edition via HathiTrust
- 1908: The Physics of Earthquake Phenomena
- 1911: Life and Scientific Work of Peter Gutherie Tait. Supplementing the Two Volumes of Scientific Papers Published in 1898 and 1900
- 1913: Physics, An Elementary Textbook for University Classes from HathiTrust
- 1915: Napier Tercentenary Memorial Volume
- 1919: "The Propagation of Earthquake Waves through the Earth and connected problems", Proceedings of the Royal Society of Edinburgh 39: 157–208

== Family ==
In 1885, Cargill married Mary Dixon, sister of James Main Dixon.

== See also ==
- Knott's equations
- James Alfred Ewing
- Arthur Schuster
