= Seismic trace =

In seismology, a seismic trace is the recorded curve from a single seismograph when measuring ground movement. The name comes from the curve plotted by a seismograph as the paper roll rotated and the needle left a trace from which information about the subsurface could be extracted. Today's instruments record the data digitally and the word trace has come to mean the digital curve.

== Complex seismic trace ==
The recorded seismic trace is considered the real part of the complex trace. By phase shifting the recorded trace by 90 degrees, we can obtain the imaginary part of the complex trace. The complex seismic trace is a complex function whose real and imaginary part are the previously mentioned. From the complex trace, one can now define seismic attributes such as the complex amplitude, phase, instantaneous phase and instantaneous frequency.
