= Seismic attribute =

Quantity derived from seismic data

In reflection seismology, a seismic attribute is a quantity extracted or derived from seismic data that can be analysed in order to enhance information that might be more subtle in a traditional seismic image, leading to a better geological or geophysical interpretation of the data. Examples of seismic attributes can include measured time, amplitude, frequency and attenuation, in addition to combinations of these. Most seismic attributes are post-stack, but those that use CMP gathers, such as amplitude versus offset (AVO), must be analysed pre-stack. They can be measured along a single seismic trace or across multiple traces within a defined window.

The first attributes developed were related to the 1D complex seismic trace and included: envelope amplitude, instantaneous phase, instantaneous frequency, and apparent polarity. Acoustic impedance obtained from seismic inversion can also be considered an attribute and was among the first developed.

Other attributes commonly used include: coherence, azimuth, dip, instantaneous amplitude, response amplitude, response phase, instantaneous bandwidth, AVO, and spectral decomposition.

A seismic attribute that can indicate the presence or absence of hydrocarbons is known as a direct hydrocarbon indicator.

== Amplitude attributes ==
Amplitude attributes use the seismic signal amplitude as the basis for their computation.

=== Mean amplitude ===
A post-stack attribute that computes the arithmetic mean of the amplitudes of a trace within a specified window. This can be used to observe the trace bias which could indicate the presence of a bright spot.

=== Average energy ===
A post-stack attribute that computes the sum of the squared amplitudes divided by the number of samples within the specified window used. This provides a measure of reflectivity and allows one to map direct hydrocarbon indicators within a zone of interest.

=== RMS (root mean square) amplitude ===
A post-stack attribute that computes the square root of the sum of squared amplitudes divided by the number of samples within the specified window used. With this root mean square amplitude, one can measure reflectivity in order to map direct hydrocarbon indicators in a zone of interest. However, RMS is sensitive to noise as it squares every value within the window.

=== Maximum magnitude ===
A post-stack attribute that computes the maximum value of the absolute value of the amplitudes within a window. This can be used to map the strongest direct hydrocarbon indicator within a zone of interest.

=== AVO attributes ===
AVO (amplitude versus offset) attributes are pre-stack attributes that have as the basis for their computation, the variation in amplitude of a seismic reflection with varying offset. These attributes include: AVO intercept, AVO gradient, intercept multiplied by gradient, far minus near, fluid factor, etc.

=== Anelastic attenuation factor ===
The anelastic attenuation factor (or Q) is a seismic attribute that can be determined from seismic reflection data for both reservoir characterisation and advanced seismic processing.

== Time/Horizon attributes ==
=== Coherence ===
A post-stack attribute that measures the continuity between seismic traces in a specified window along a picked horizon. It can be used to map the lateral extent of a formation. It can also be used to see faults, channels or other discontinuous features.

Although it should be used along a specified horizon, many software packages compute this attribute along arbitrary time-slices.

=== Dip ===
A post-stack attribute that computes, for each trace, the best fit plane (3D) or line (2D) between its immediate neighbor traces on a horizon and outputs the magnitude of dip (gradient) of said plane or line measured in degrees. This can be used to create a pseudo paleogeological map on a horizon slice.

=== Azimuth ===
A post-stack attribute that computes, for each trace, the best fit plane (3D) between its immediate neighbor traces on a horizon and outputs the direction of maximum slope (dip direction) measured in degrees, clockwise from north. This is not to be confused with the geological concept of azimuth, which is equivalent to strike and is measured 90° counterclockwise from the dip direction.

=== Curvature ===
A group of post-stack attributes that are computed from the curvature of a specified horizon. These attributes include: magnitude or direction of maximum curvature, magnitude or direction of minimum curvature, magnitude of curvature along the horizon's azimuth (dip) direction, magnitude of curvature along the horizon's strike direction, magnitude of curvature of a contour line along a horizon.

== Frequency attributes ==
These attributes involve separating and classifying seismic events within each trace based on their frequency content. The application of these attributes is commonly called spectral decomposition. The starting point of spectral decomposition is to decompose each 1D trace from the time domain into its corresponding 2D representation in the time-frequency domain by means of any method of time-frequency decomposition such as: short-time Fourier transform, continuous wavelet transform, Wigner-Ville distribution, matching pursuit, among many others. Once each trace has been transformed into the time-frequency domain, a bandpass filter can be applied to view the amplitudes of seismic data at any frequency or range of frequencies.

Technically, each individual frequency or band of frequencies could be considered an attribute. The seismic data is usually filtered at various frequency ranges in order to show certain geological patterns that may not be obvious in the other frequency bands. There is an inverse relationship between the thickness of a rock layer and the corresponding peak frequency of its seismic reflection. That is, thinner rock layers are much more apparent at higher frequencies and thicker rock layers are much more apparent at lower frequencies. This can be used to qualitatively identify thinning or thickening of a rock unit in different directions.

Spectral decomposition has also been widely used as a direct hydrocarbon indicator.
