= Bright spot =

Spike in a seismic attribute, often indicating hydrocarbons

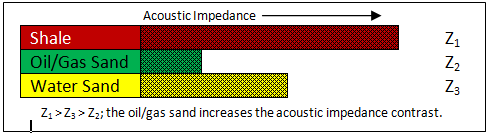
The diagram above shows the acoustic impedance relationship that results in a bright spot.

In reflection seismology, a bright spot is a local high amplitude seismic attribute anomaly that can indicate the presence of hydrocarbons and is therefore known as a direct hydrocarbon indicator. It is used by geophysicists in hydrocarbon exploration.

== History ==
Bright spots were not commonly identified until the early 1970s because of the extensive and industry-wide use of automatic gain control, which obscured the amplitude effects of hydrocarbon accumulations.

== Theory ==
A bright spot primarily results from the increase in acoustic impedance contrast when a hydrocarbon (with a lower acoustic impedance) replaces the brine-saturated zone (with a higher acoustic impedance) that underlies a shale (with a higher acoustic impedance still), increasing the reflection coefficient. The effect decreases with depth because compaction for sands and shales occurs at different rates and the acoustic impedance relationship stated above will not hold after a certain depth/age. Below this depth, there will be a crossover of shale and sand acoustic impedances and a dim spot is more useful to hydrocarbon exploration.

== Caution ==
The relationship between hydrocarbons and direct hydrocarbon indicators, such as bright spots, is not straightforward and not all bright spots are caused by the presence of hydrocarbons and therefore they should not be treated as conclusive evidence of hydrocarbon accumulations.

== See also ==
- Polarity reversal (seismology)
