= Manny Ramirez =

Dominican-American baseball player (born 1972)

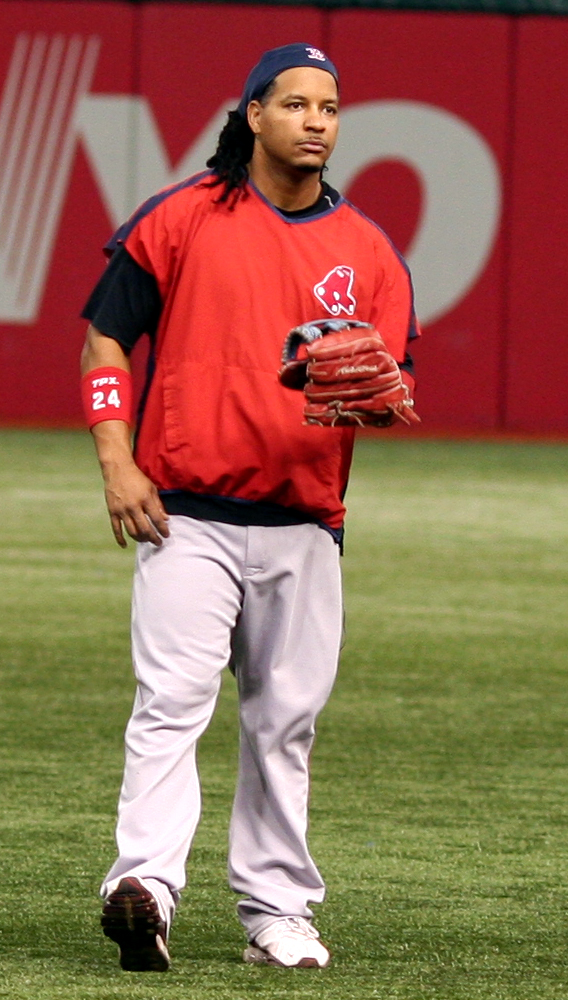
- Ramirez with the Boston Red Sox in 2007
- Outfielder
- Born: May 30, 1972 (age 54); Santo Domingo, Dominican Republic
- Batted: Right Threw: Right

MLB debut
- September 2, 1993, for the Cleveland Indians

Last MLB appearance
- April 6, 2011, for the Tampa Bay Rays

MLB statistics
- Batting average: .312
- Hits: 2,574
- Home runs: 555
- Runs batted in: 1,831
- Stats at Baseball Reference

Teams
- Cleveland Indians (1993–2000); Boston Red Sox (2001–2008); Los Angeles Dodgers (2008–2010); Chicago White Sox (2010); Tampa Bay Rays (2011)

Career highlights and awards
- 12× All-Star (1995, 1998–2008); 2× World Series champion (2004, 2007); World Series MVP (2004); 9× Silver Slugger Award (1995, 1999–2006); 2× AL Hank Aaron Award (1999, 2004); AL batting champion (2002); AL home run leader (2004); AL RBI leader (1999); Cleveland Guardians Hall of Fame; Boston Red Sox Hall of Fame

Manuel Arístides Ramírez Onelcida (born May 30, 1972) is a Dominican-American former professional baseball outfielder. He played in Major League Baseball (MLB) for parts of 19 seasons. He played with the Cleveland Indians, Boston Red Sox, Los Angeles Dodgers, Chicago White Sox, and Tampa Bay Rays before playing one season at the Chinese Professional Baseball League in Taiwan. Ramirez is recognized for having great batting skill and power. He was a nine-time Silver Slugger and was one of 28 players to hit 500 career home runs. His 21 grand slams are third all-time, and his 29 postseason home runs are the most in MLB history. He appeared in 12 All-Star Games, with a streak of eleven consecutive games beginning in 1998 that included every season that he played with the Red Sox.

Ramirez was born in Santo Domingo, Dominican Republic. When he was 13 years old, he moved to New York City with his parents, Onelcida and Aristides. He attended George Washington High School and became a baseball standout. He was drafted 13th overall by the Cleveland Indians in the first round of the 1991 Major League Baseball draft. He made his MLB debut on September 2, 1993.

In 1994, Ramirez became a major league regular and finished second in voting for the Rookie of the Year Award. By 1995, he had become an All-Star. He helped lead the Indians to five consecutive playoff berths from 1995 to 1999; this included an appearance in the 1995 and 1997 World Series. In 1999, Ramirez set the Indians' single-season RBI record with 165 RBIs. After the 2000 season, Ramirez signed with the Boston Red Sox. During his time in Boston, Ramirez and teammate David Ortiz became one of the best offensive tandems in baseball history. Ramirez led the Red Sox to World Series Championships in 2004 and 2007 before being traded to the Los Angeles Dodgers in 2008 as part of a three-team deal that also involved the Pittsburgh Pirates.

In 2009, Ramirez was suspended 50 games for violating baseball's drug policy by taking human chorionic gonadotropin (hCG), a women's fertility drug that is often taken after steroids. In the spring of 2011, Ramirez was informed by MLB of another violation of its drug policy, and a 100-game suspension. He chose to retire on April 8 rather than be suspended. However, in September 2011, Ramirez wished to be reinstated and agreed in December with the league to a reduced 50-game suspension. Though he played at various points in the Oakland Athletics, Texas Rangers, and Chicago Cubs systems, as well as internationally, Ramirez did not appear in another Major League game.

Known as a complete hitter who could hit for both power and average, and widely regarded as one of the best right-handed hitters of his generation, Ramirez finished his career with a lifetime .312 batting average, 555 home runs (15th all-time), and 1,831 RBI (18th all-time). In 111 postseason games, Ramirez posted a .285 batting average with 29 home runs and 78 RBI.

== Early life ==
Ramirez was born in Santo Domingo, Dominican Republic, to Aristides and Onelcida Ramirez and spent 13 years living there. As a child, Ramirez was obsessed with baseball. When he was eight years old, his grandmother got him a Dodgers uniform with the number 30 on the back, which he considers to be one of his most prized possessions. In 1985, he moved to the Washington Heights neighborhood of New York City with his parents. He often played ball at the nearby Snake Hill, the same place Lou Gehrig played during his childhood. Despite living just a short distance from Yankee Stadium, Ramirez rooted for the Toronto Blue Jays, who had as he described his Dominican heroes George Bell and Tony Fernández on its roster; he attended games when the Blue Jays were in town.

Ramirez attended George Washington High School from 1987 to 1991, leaving at the age of 19 without graduating. During his time on the team, GWHS was seeing a large increase in the number of immigrants. This was apparent, as GWHS's baseball team was composed entirely of Dominicans. As a youth, Ramirez preferred to not be the center of attention and was often very modest. During his time at GWHS, he led his team to three straight division championships. As a junior in 1990, he had a batting average of .633 and hit 16 home runs. He was a three-time all-city selection in baseball, and as a high school senior was named New York City Public School Player of the Year in 1991, hitting for a .650 batting average with 14 home runs in 22 games.

== Career ==
=== Minor leagues ===
The Cleveland Indians selected Ramirez in the first round with the 13th overall pick of the 1991 MLB draft and gave him a $250,000 signing bonus. He was assigned to the Rookie-level Burlington Indians for his professional debut. He was named the Appalachian League MVP and was selected by Baseball America as short-season Player of the Year while slugging 19 homers and driving in 63 runs in 59 games, while leading the league in slugging and total bases. With the Single-A Kinston Indians in 1992, Ramirez battled injuries but still hit .278 with 13 homers and 63 RBIs in 81 games and was named as the number three prospect and the "Most Exciting Player in the Carolina League" by Baseball America. In 1993, Ramirez was named "Minor League Player of the Year" by Baseball America while hitting .333 with 31 homers and 115 RBIs in 129 combined games with the Double-A Canton–Akron Indians and Triple-A Charlotte Knights.

=== Cleveland Indians (1993–2000) ===
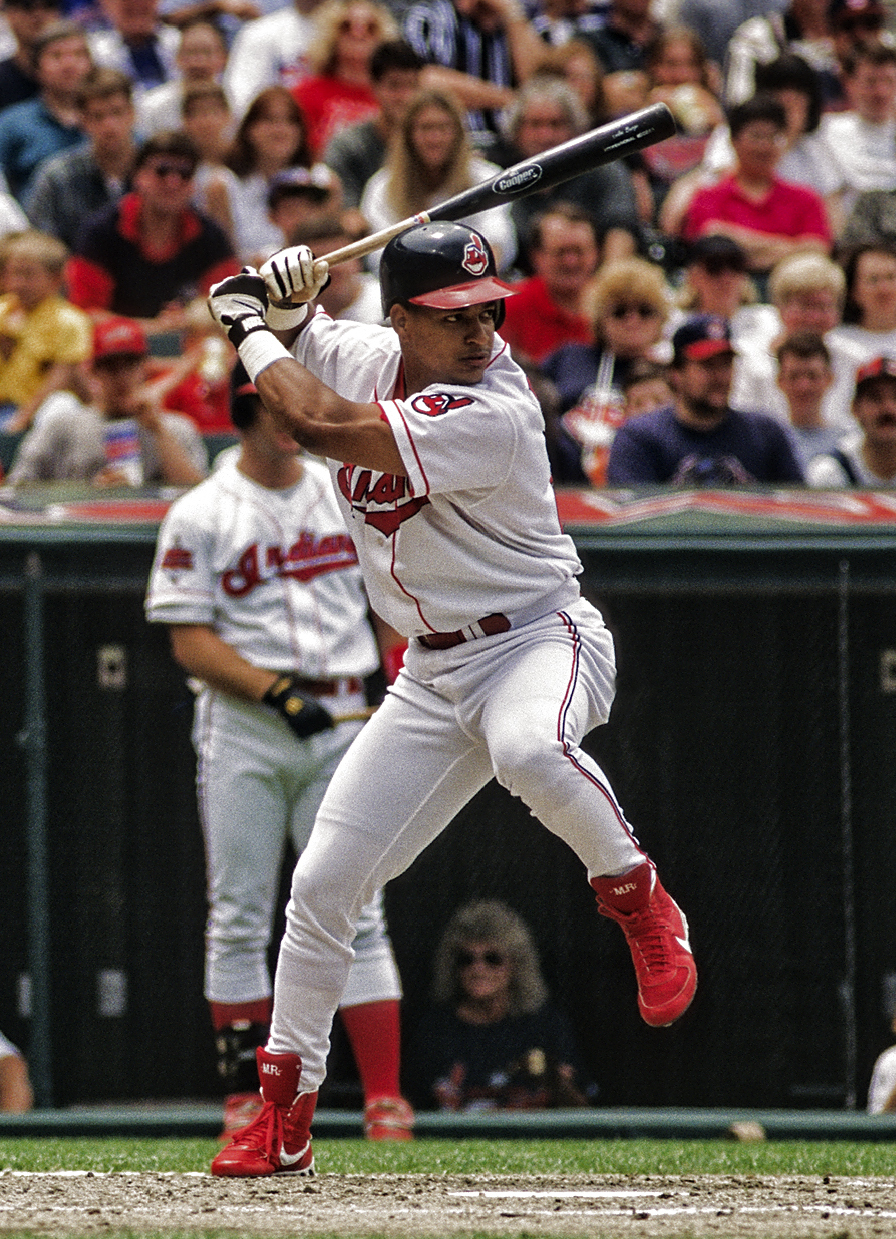
Ramirez bats in 1996

==== 1993–1994 ====
Ramirez made his major league debut on September 2, 1993, against the Minnesota Twins, going hitless in four at-bats as the designated hitter. The following day, when the Indians took on the New York Yankees, Ramirez went 3 for 4 with his first two home runs, with many of his family and friends in attendance at Yankee Stadium. His first career base hit was hit against Mélido Pérez. His first MLB hit off Perez was an automatic double that bounced into the left-field seats as left fielder Paul O'Neill pursued it. Ramirez, seeing the ball in the seats, continued running thinking he had hit a home run, before returning to second base while his teammates ribbed him. After flying out to O'Neill in his next plate appearance, Ramirez homered in his final two at-bats.

In 1994, his first full season in the majors, Ramirez had a strong start to the season, hitting six home runs during the month of April. Despite a weak start to May, he rebounded in the latter half of the month, finishing the month with a .300 batting average. During the season, the Indians were chasing the Chicago White Sox for first place in the American League Central (AL Central) division all the way until the end of the season. However, the team's season ended in August due to the 1994 MLB strike. Ramirez finished second in the Rookie of the Year award voting after batting .269 with 17 home runs and 60 RBI in 91 games.

==== 1995–1997 ====
Ramirez's breakout season came in 1995, when he batted .308 with 31 home runs and 107 RBI. In July, he was selected to his first All-Star Game and won his first career Silver Slugger Award following the season. That year, the Indians reached the postseason, and Ramirez hit two home runs in the 1995 American League Championship Series against the Mariners, which the Indians won in six games. The Indians then took on the Atlanta Braves in the World Series, and Ramirez batted .222 with one home run in the Indians' six-game loss. In December 1995, Ramirez agreed to a $10.15 million, four-year contract.

Ramirez continued to hit well in 1996, batting .309 with 33 home runs and 112 RBI. The Indians again reached the playoffs, and Ramirez batted .375 with two home runs in the Indians' loss to the Orioles in the 1996 American League Division Series. In 1997, Ramirez's contact continued to improve, though his power dipped slightly, as he hit .328 with 26 home runs and 88 RBI. This year, the Indians again reached the World Series, and Ramirez batted .154 with two home runs as the Indians lost to the Florida Marlins in seven games.

==== 1998–2000 ====
In 1998, Ramirez experienced a great increase in power, on his way to becoming one of the great run producers in the game. He batted .294 with 45 home runs and 145 RBIs, and was selected to his second All-Star Game, where he recorded a sacrifice fly and RBI. Ramirez batted .357 with two home runs during the ALDS versus the Red Sox, which the Indians won in four games. In the ALCS against the Yankees, Ramirez batted .333 with two home runs, but the Indians lost in six games. Following the season, Ramirez came in sixth place in AL MVP voting.

Ramirez began 1999 on a hot streak, hitting .337 with seven home runs in the month of April. Ramirez's hot hitting continued all season, as he batted .364 in May and reached the All-Star break with 25 home runs and 96 RBI. At the time, it was the third-highest single-season total for RBI by the All-Star Break in MLB history, behind only Hank Greenberg (103 in 1935) and Juan González (101 in 1998). On September 30, 1999, Ramirez broke the Indians' single-season RBI record (previously 162 by Hal Trosky in 1936) by hitting a three-run home run, giving Ramirez 164. Despite missing 15 games, he finished 1999 with 165 RBI, the highest total by any player since Jimmie Foxx (1938), and batted an eye-popping .383 against left-handed pitchers. He also batted .383 with runners in scoring position, and .377 with men on base. That season, he finished third in the voting for the AL MVP award. However, he struggled in the 1999 postseason, going 1-for-18 as the Indians were eliminated by the Boston Red Sox in 5 games in the 1999 American League Division Series.

In 2000, Ramirez was limited to 118 games due to a hamstring injury, but recorded a career-high .351 batting average, along with 38 home runs and 122 RBI. His return is believed to have started a major comeback that led the Indians to a final record of 90–72 and cut the number of games they were behind the leader of the AL Central, the Chicago White Sox, from 11.5 games down to 7.5 games in just a month. Because of his return, Roberto Alomar, Omar Vizquel, and Kenny Lofton all started getting better pitches to hit, which also significantly increased their batting averages. Despite the comeback, the Indians failed to make the postseason, finishing five games behind the White Sox in the AL Central. With free agency looming, Ramirez homered in his final game and at-bat in an Indians uniform, on October 1 against Toronto in front of the home fans at Jacobs Field.

=== Boston Red Sox (2001–2008) ===
==== 2001–2003 ====
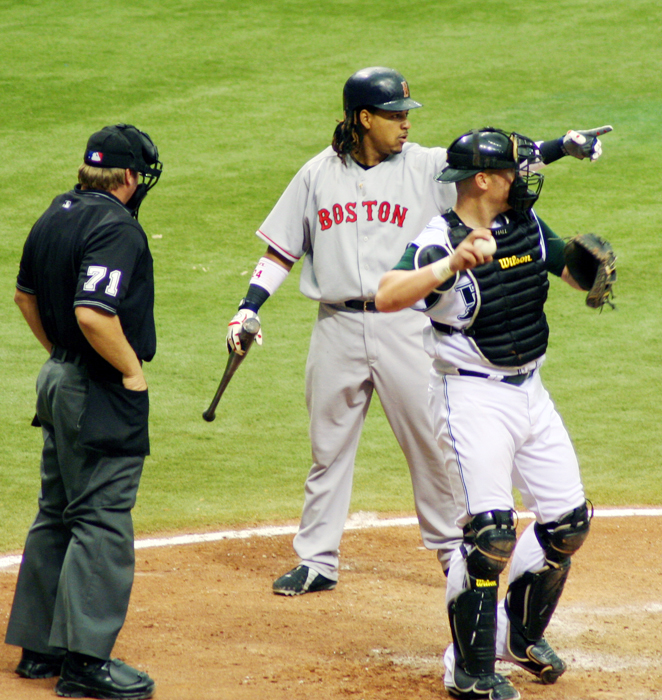
Ramirez asking the first base umpire if he went around on a checked swing

In November 2000, the Indians offered Ramirez a seven-year, $119 million contract. While this would have made Ramirez the highest-paid player in baseball, the deal was rejected by Ramirez and his agent, Jeff Moorad, who were seeking a ten-year, $200 million contract. Ramirez was reportedly pursued by the New York Yankees and Seattle Mariners, but in December agreed to an eight-year, $160 million deal with the Boston Red Sox, with $20 million options for 2009 and 2010, pushing the total value of the contract to $200 million for 10 years.

Ramirez immediately delivered for the Red Sox, hitting .408 in April 2001. He had another sterling first half, amassing a .335 batting average with 26 home runs and 84 RBI at the 2001 All-Star break. Although he missed some time battling hamstring injuries and struggled down the stretch, Ramirez finished the 2001 season at .306 with 41 home runs and 125 RBI, setting the season franchise record of hitting the most home runs as a first year Red Sox player. On June 23, Ramirez hit two monstrous home runs against the Toronto Blue Jays at Fenway Park, with the second one hitting the very top of the light tower in left field. Its length was officially listed at 501 feet, second-longest by a Red Sox player in Fenway Park's history, just short of Ted Williams' 1946 record of 502 feet. He also launched a prodigious home run in an away game on June 3 against the Blue Jays into the fifth deck at the SkyDome, which still stands as the longest home run in that ballpark's history at 491 feet. However, despite his efforts, the Red Sox did not qualify for the MLB postseason in 2001. Ramirez, primarily a right fielder in his career to this point, spent most of the season as the designated hitter for the Red Sox. This was due to the Red Sox's belief that Ramirez was best suited to left field due to the presence of Trot Nixon in right, as well as the injuries Ramirez battled during the 2001 season. After signing with the Red Sox, Ramirez played only seven more games in right field, all of which came during the 2002 season.

Ramirez only played in 120 games in 2002 due to a hamstring injury that put him on the disabled list (DL) from mid-May to the end of June. Despite this, Ramirez won the AL batting title, hitting .349 (including .438 against lefties), and his .647 slugging percentage was second in the league behind Jim Thome's .677. Like clockwork, Ramirez again reached the 30 home run and 100 RBI plateaus, posting 33 and 107 respectively. He hit his 300th career home run on August 26 against the Angels' Ramón Ortiz. It was the first of two home runs on the night for Ramirez, as he went 5-for-5 overall. However, the Red Sox again failed to qualify for the MLB postseason in 2002.

In 2003, Ramirez again posted strong offensive numbers, finishing with a .325 average, 37 home runs, and 104 RBI. The second-half surge of newly acquired fellow Dominican slugger David Ortiz gave the Red Sox a formidable one-two punch in the middle of the lineup with Ramirez. However, in the summer, Ramirez missed several games with pharyngitis, but got into hot water as he was spotted in a bar in the hotel where he lived with a close friend, Yankees infielder Enrique Wilson, despite being supposedly too ill to play in the series against the rival Yankees. Ramirez and Wilson both maintained that Manny was just talking to his friend in that setting, and not actually drinking or partying as the media speculated. Boston manager Grady Little benched Ramirez for one game as a result. Despite this distraction, the Red Sox finished the season 95-67, qualifying for the MLB postseason for the first time with Ramirez. In the decisive fifth game of their Division Series matchup against the Oakland Athletics, Ramirez broke a sixth inning 1-1 tie by launching a go-ahead three-run homer off Barry Zito that set up an ALCS showdown with the rival Yankees. In ALCS Game 3, Ramirez was at the center of a bench-clearing brawl. Early in the game, Red Sox pitcher Pedro Martínez had hit Yankees outfielder Karim Garcia up high with a pitch, sparking heated dialogue, and a hard slide by Garcia into Red Sox second baseman Todd Walker had exacerbated the tensions. The very next inning, Yankees pitcher Roger Clemens threw a pitch high and inside to Ramirez, and Manny charged the mound, sparking the melee. The Red Sox lost the game 4-3. Despite Ramirez's strong play in the ALCS against the Yankees (.310 with two home runs), the Red Sox fell to the Yankees in the decisive seventh game on Aaron Boone's infamous extra-inning, walk-off home run.

During the offseason that followed, the new Red Sox ownership (led by John W. Henry) and management tried to rid themselves of Ramirez's massive contract, despite his high level of production. Believed to be necessary in pursuit of a trade for Texas Rangers shortstop Alex Rodriguez, the team put Ramirez on irrevocable waivers, thus making him available to any team willing to assume the remainder of his contract. However, all 29 other teams passed on the opportunity to claim Ramirez due to the high cost, and Rodriguez was acquired by the Yankees instead, as a replacement for Boone after the latter had blown out his knee playing offseason basketball. Also noteworthy from 2003 (though it was not revealed until 2009), according to the New York Times, Ramirez tested positive for performance-enhancing drugs that season from the "survey" drug test, in which MLB players were tested to see if drugs were being used. Players faced no penalties or sanctions for testing positive. Ramirez was one of 104 players to have allegedly tested positive.

==== 2004 ====
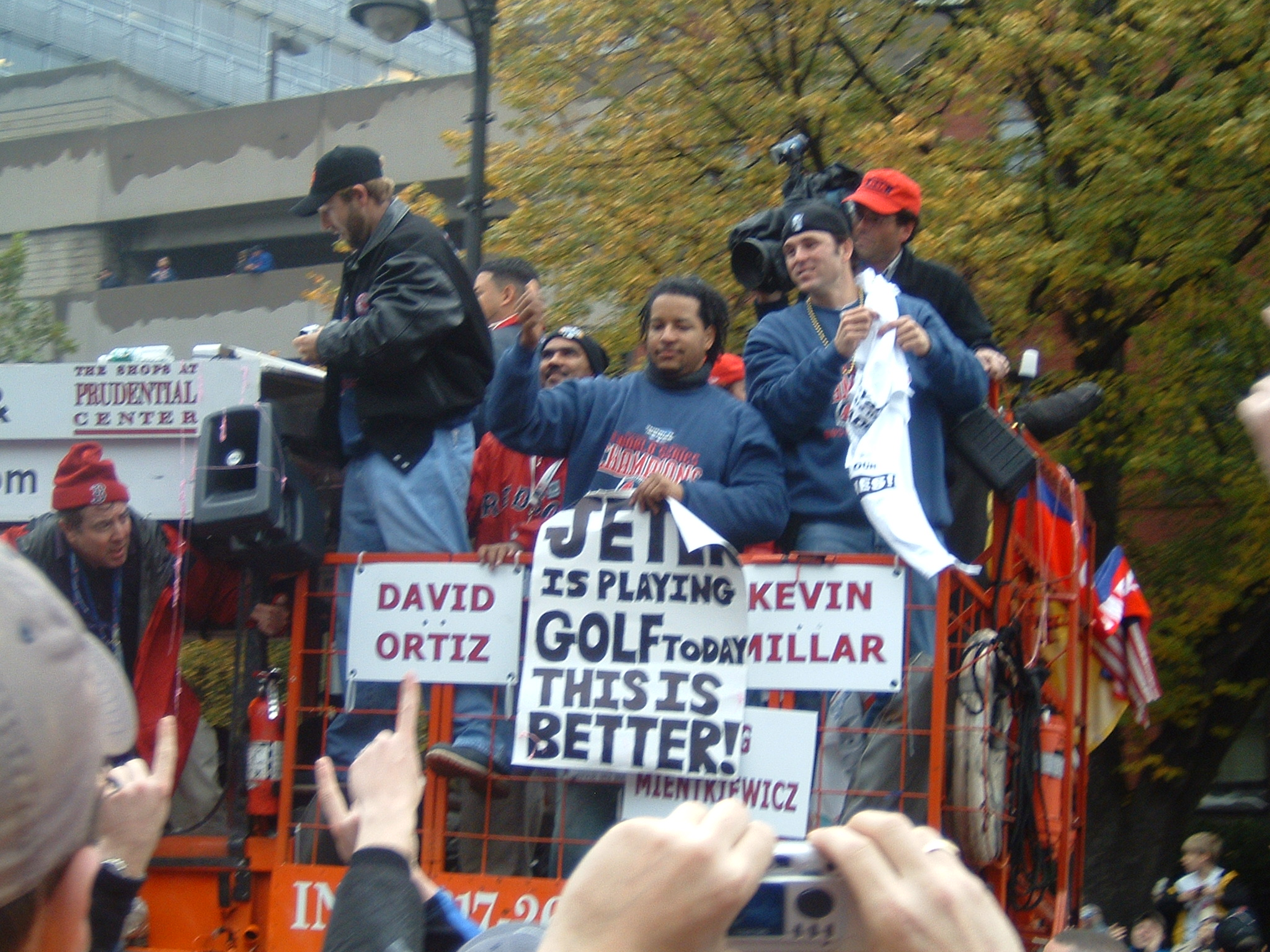
Ramirez at the Red Sox victory parade

In 2004, Ramirez led the AL in home runs (43), slugging percentage (.613) and OPS (1.009); he finished second in errors committed as a left fielder (7), third in RBIs (130), fourth in doubles (44) and total bases (348), sixth in on-base percentage (.397), eighth in walks (82), tenth in runs (108), and posted a .308 batting average. He also led the AL in salary, at $22.5 million.

In addition, Ramirez and teammate David Ortiz became the first pair of AL teammates to hit 40 home runs, have 100 RBIs, and bat .300 since the Yankees' Babe Ruth and Lou Gehrig in 1931. Together they hit back-to-back home runs six times, tying the major league single-season mark set by the Detroit Tigers' Hank Greenberg and Rudy York and later matched by the Chicago White Sox's Frank Thomas and Magglio Ordóñez.

In the 2004 Major League Baseball All-Star Game, Ramirez hit a two-run home run off Roger Clemens in the top of the first inning, giving his teammates a 3–0 lead. Ramirez, Derek Jeter (with a single), Ichiro Suzuki (with a double) and Iván Rodríguez (with a triple) became the first All-Star quartet that combined to hit for the cycle during the same inning. The Red Sox again qualified for the postseason, and Ramirez continued his hot hitting. He hit .385 in the 2004 ALDS, leading the Red Sox to a sweep over the Anaheim Angels, and setting up a rematch in the 2004 American League Championship Series against the Yankees. Despite not driving in a run in the ALCS, Ramirez hit .300 as the Red Sox completed a historic comeback from down 3 games to 0 to win in seven against the Yankees, setting up a showdown with the St. Louis Cardinals in the 2004 World Series as the Red Sox attempted to end the Curse of the Bambino and win their first championship since 1918. Ramirez proceeded to hit .412 with a home run and 4 RBI in a 4-game sweep of the Cardinals, as the Red Sox won their first title in 86 years. His home run came in the first inning of Game 3, off Cardinals starter Jeff Suppan, continuing a streak throughout the Series where the Red Sox scored in the first inning of each game. Ramirez's 2004 season was capped off by being named World Series MVP. Ramirez also finished third in AL MVP voting, just ahead of teammate Ortiz, who finished fourth.

==== 2005–2006 ====
On May 15, 2005, Ramirez hit his 400th home run off Gil Meche of the Seattle Mariners. On July 5, Ramirez hit his 20th career grand slam — and his third of the season — off Chris Young of the Texas Rangers. On defense, however, he tied for the lead among all major league left fielders in errors, with seven. He posted his highest single-season RBI total as a Red Sox in 2005, driving in 144 runs to go along with his 45 homers, but he batted only .292, his first time under .300 since 1998. Along with teammate David Ortiz, who drove in 148 runs, the duo combined to drive in an outstanding 292 runs. Ortiz finished second, and Ramirez fourth, in MVP voting to winner Alex Rodriguez.

Off the field, the season was one of much conflict for Ramirez. Persistent trade rumors (generally involving the New York Mets) dogged him all season. After the Red Sox were eliminated in the first round of that year's playoffs by the eventual World Series champion Chicago White Sox, Ramirez once again expressed a wish to be traded. This included a threat to not show up for spring training if his latest demand was not met by Red Sox GM Theo Epstein. Toward this end, in December 2005, Ramirez put his Ritz-Carlton condominium up for sale. Trade rumors circulated with Ramirez possibly going to the Baltimore Orioles or the New York Mets, but no deal was reached. By January 5, 2006, Ramirez changed his mind, stating that he was dropping the demand. His agents, in turn, insisted their client was still open to a trade. But no deal materialized.

On June 10, 2006, Ramirez became the 31st player in history to hit 450 home runs, with a solo home run off Francisco Cordero of the Texas Rangers. Three weeks later, on July 1, he collected his 2000th hit. Beginning in mid-July, he had a 28-game hitting streak, including 12 multi-hit games, eight home runs, and 28 RBI. He reached 100 RBI for the ninth consecutive season on August 20 in a series against the Yankees, but missed 28 games from mid-August on with soreness in his right knee. Ramirez finished at .321 with 35 home runs and 102 RBI. He also drew a career-high 100 walks in 2006, the only time in his career he reached that mark. However, the Red Sox missed the playoffs for the first time since the 2002 season.

==== 2007–2008 ====
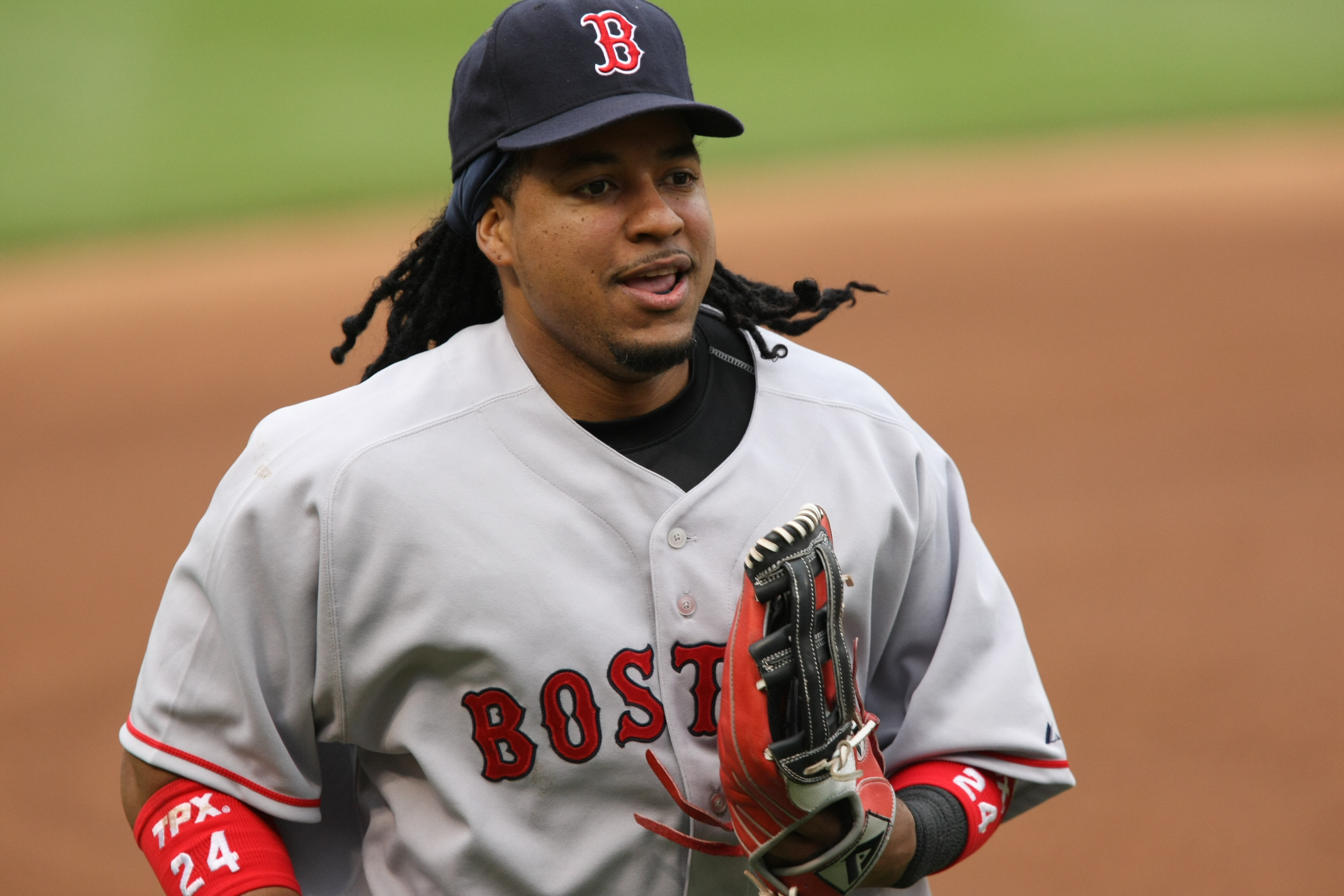
Ramirez in 2008

On April 22, 2007, Ramirez was the first of four Red Sox batters to homer in consecutive at-bats in a game against the New York Yankees pitcher Chase Wright, tying a league record when J. D. Drew, Mike Lowell, and Jason Varitek followed Ramirez with longballs of their own. On April 29, Ramirez became the fifth player to hit 50 career home runs against the Yankees.

Ramirez finished 2007 with a .296 batting average, 20 home runs, and 88 RBI, ending his streak of 30 home run and 100 RBI seasons at nine. His season was cut short when he strained his left oblique in late August during a Yankees series, but he did return to the lineup for the final homestand of the season. In 2007, he had the highest fielding percentage (.990) among left fielders in the AL, tied for second in the major leagues; he was ranked sixth-highest in range factor of all AL left fielders, 1.72, 16th in both leagues, but had the lowest zone rating among MLB left fielders with 100+ games (.713). He made two errors during the 2007 season in left field, and tied for sixth overall in the major leagues in assists from left field.

In the postseason, Ramirez hit a walk-off three-run home run in the bottom of the ninth inning of Game 2 of the American League Division Series against the Los Angeles Angels of Anaheim, breaking a 3-3 tie as he launched the ball over Fenway Park's Monster seats beyond the left-field wall. In the fourth inning of the series' final game, Ramirez combined with teammate David Ortiz to hit back-to-back home runs off pitcher Jered Weaver. The home run tied him with Bernie Williams for first place all-time in postseason home runs with 22. The Red Sox advanced to the 2007 American League Championship Series against the Cleveland Indians where, on October 13, Ramirez hit his 23rd postseason home run, passing Williams for the most all-time. He helped the Red Sox to reach and win the 2007 World Series, where they swept the Colorado Rockies, by batting a combined .348 with four home runs and 16 RBI in the postseason. Ramirez earned his second World Series ring, as the Red Sox earned their seventh title.

2008 opened with Ramirez and the Red Sox defending their crown, and with Ramirez himself stating he wanted "to play six more years and then retire as a member of the Red Sox." Ramirez played in his 2,000th game on May 26, 2008, against Seattle. On May 31, 2008, Ramirez hit his 500th home run, against Baltimore Orioles pitcher Chad Bradford at Camden Yards in the seventh inning on the first pitch. He became the 24th player in MLB history to do so. He joined two other Boston legends, Jimmie Foxx and Ted Williams, to have joined the exclusive home run club as a member of the Red Sox.

A heated altercation between Ramirez and teammate Kevin Youkilis took place on June 5, during a game at Fenway Park against the Tampa Bay Rays. The Boston Globe speculated that Youkilis was angry that Ramirez had been slow to join a bench-clearing brawl earlier in the game. The altercation may have also been caused by Ramirez objecting to what he believed was excessive complaining by Youkilis about the strike zone, as well as the first baseman's penchant for sometimes throwing his helmet in frustration after making an out. Before the fifth inning, Ramirez was caught on NESN cameras taking a swing at Youkilis. Ramirez and Youkilis yelled at each other and had to be separated by teammates, coaches, and training staff. Youkilis headed out to the field still yelling at Ramirez, while Ramirez was escorted into the tunnel leading to the clubhouse by bench coach Brad Mills and trainer Paul Lessard.

Later in the season, during a series with the Houston Astros, Ramirez had a physical altercation with elderly Red Sox traveling secretary Jack McCormick. The two were arguing over McCormick's inability to fill Ramirez's large game-day request for 16 tickets to the game in Houston. Ramirez pushed the 64-year-old McCormick to the ground after telling him "Just do your job." The two were quickly separated and Ramirez later offered a public apology but did not apologize to McCormick in person until 2014. The matter was dealt with internally, and Ramirez was fined $10,000–15,000.

On July 25, after sitting out a game against the Seattle Mariners with a sore knee, Ramirez was slated to start against the Yankees. However, several minutes before the game, he informed manager Terry Francona, through a bench coach, that he would not be playing. During the series, Ramirez was directed to an area hospital for MRIs on both his knees; the results showed no damage. When back in action, Ramirez frequently failed to run out ground balls. Assuming that this was due to his displeasure about his contract situation (Ramirez could become a free agent at season's end, but the Red Sox held 2 years of team options they had not yet exercised), many Red Sox fans and reporters, including Dan Shaughnessy of the Boston Globe, called for Ramirez to be traded. Despite all these distractions, Ramirez did continue to hit solidly when on the field, as he batted .299 with 20 home runs and 68 RBI through the first 100 games of the season.

=== Los Angeles Dodgers (2008–2010) ===
==== 2008 ====
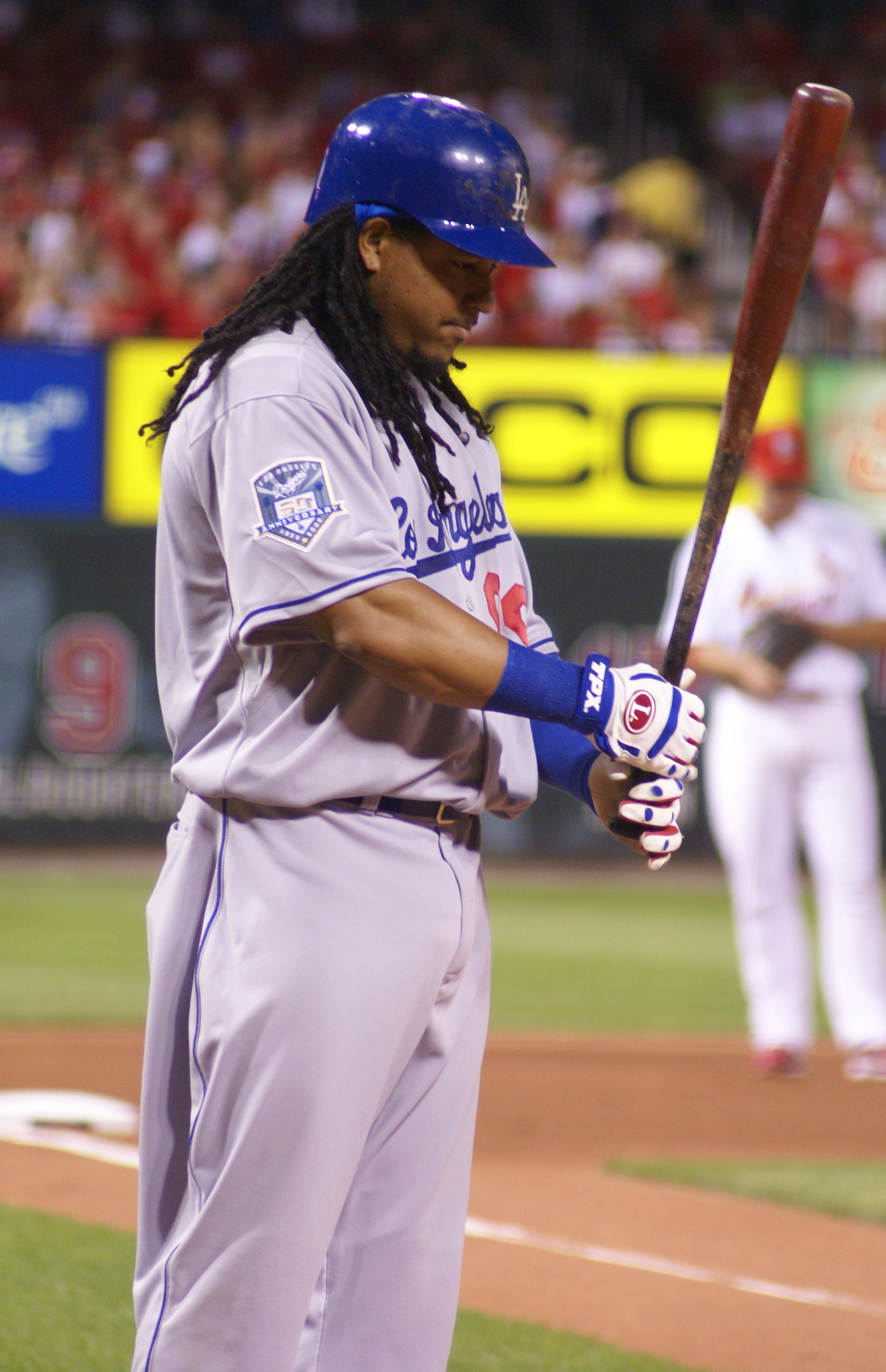
Ramirez in 2008, during his tenure with the Dodgers

On July 31, 2008, Ramirez was traded to the Los Angeles Dodgers in a three-way deal. The Boston Red Sox acquired outfielder Jason Bay and minor league infielder Josh Wilson, and the Pittsburgh Pirates got infielder Andy LaRoche and pitching prospect Bryan Morris from the Dodgers and outfielder Brandon Moss and pitcher Craig Hansen from the Red Sox. Ramirez had always worn uniform number 24, but the Dodgers had retired that number in honor of Hall of Fame manager Walter Alston. Ramirez instead chose to wear number 99 with the Dodgers.

After going 2-for-4 in his first game as a Dodger, Ramirez never looked back. He hit his first Dodger home run the following day in another 2-for-4 performance. Manny went on to be named the NL Player of the Month for August 2008, touching off "Mannywood" in Los Angeles. He hit .415 (44-for-106) with seven doubles, nine home runs, 25 RBIs and 21 runs scored during the month. He finished the season with the Dodgers by batting .396 with 17 home runs and 53 RBI in just 53 games, remarkable numbers for a 36-year-old. His combined totals were a .332 batting average, 37 home runs, and 121 RBI.

Among all major leaguers, Ramirez finished 2008 third in batting average, second in slugging percentage, and third in OPS. With Ramirez in the lineup, the Dodgers won the NL West, then swept the Chicago Cubs in the Division Series before losing in the NLCS to the eventual World Series-winning Philadelphia Phillies in five games. During the playoffs, Ramirez hit an astounding .520 with four home runs, two doubles, 11 walks and 10 RBI.

Ramirez was fourth in the voting for the 2008 NL MVP award, with 138 points, behind Albert Pujols, Ryan Howard, and Ryan Braun; this was remarkable for someone who played less than half a season in the NL. After the Dodgers lost in the playoffs, Ramirez, a free agent to be, was asked about his future. "Gas is up, and so am I", was his reply, indicating that he expected to be valued highly in the free-agent market. After long and contentious negotiations that dragged into the start of spring training, Ramirez signed a two-year $45 million contract to remain with the Dodgers on March 4.

==== 2009 ====
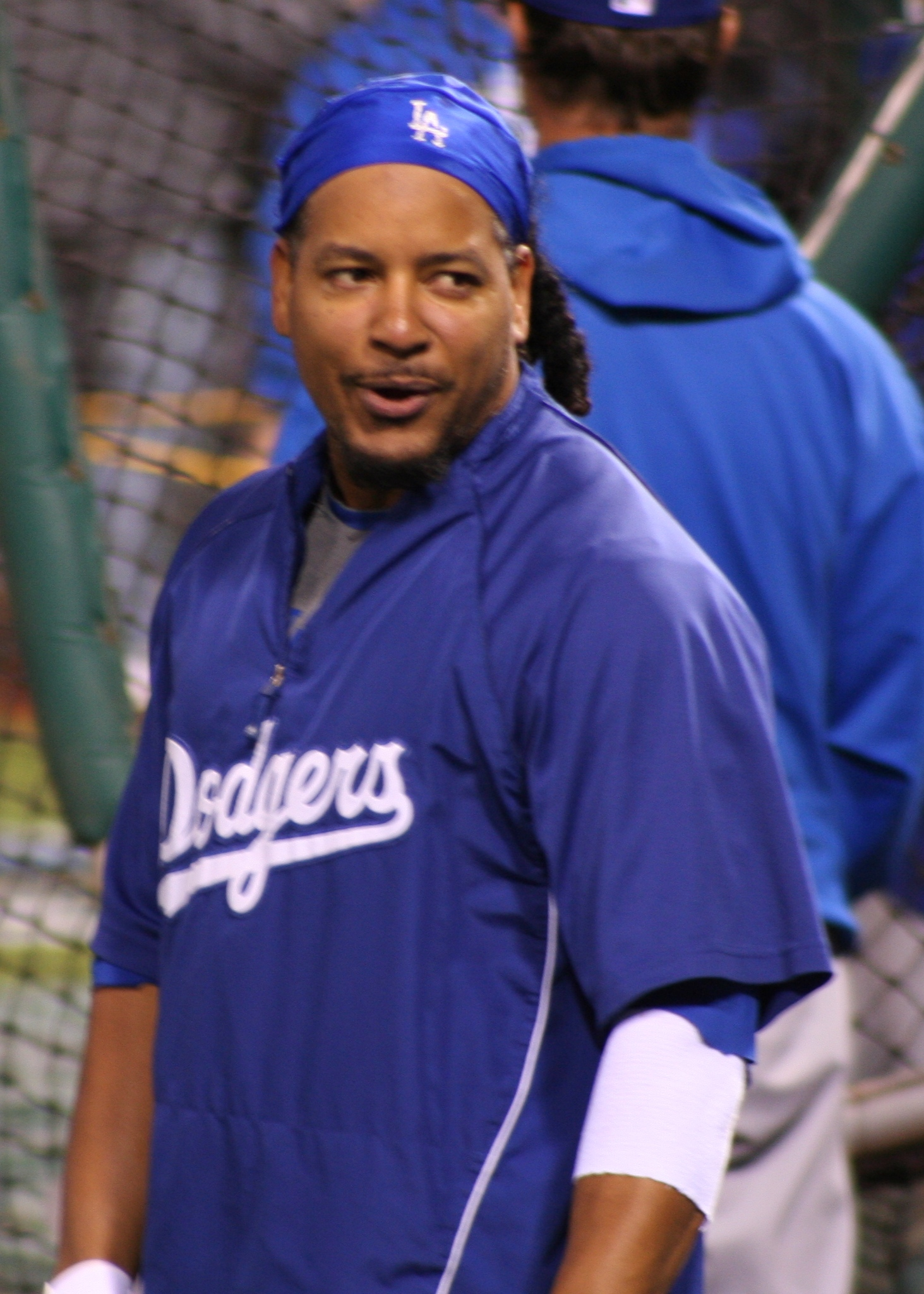
Ramirez in 2009

Ramirez began 2009 at a highly productive pace as well. Through May 7, he was batting .348 with six home runs and 20 RBI. But on that date, Ramirez was suspended 50 games for violating the Joint Drug Prevention and Treatment Program established by MLB and the MLB Players Association in 2004. In the announcement by MLB, Ramirez was suspended for unspecified violation of the agreement section 8.G.2. Shortly afterward, Ramirez stated that a physician had unknowingly prescribed a banned medication. After consulting with the players association, Ramirez waived his right to challenge the suspension. According to an ESPN report, the drug used by Ramirez was human chorionic gonadotropin (hCG), a women's fertility drug typically used by steroid users to restart their body's natural testosterone production as they come off a steroid cycle. It is similar to Clomid, the drug Jason Giambi and others used as clients of BALCO. Testing revealed artificial testosterone, too. As a condition for returning from the suspension, Ramirez was subject to three additional drug tests per year in addition to the minimum of two per player.

During his suspension, Ramirez was allowed to work out at the Dodgers' facilities and he trained with Dodger coach Manny Mota. To get back into shape he was allowed a short rehab stint in the minor leagues. Ramirez played two games with the AAA Albuquerque Isotopes, where his appearance led to record crowds for the Isotopes. He played several games with the Single-A Inland Empire 66ers, homering in his first at-bat with the 66ers. Ramirez returned from his suspension and reclaimed his starting role with the Dodgers on July 3 against the San Diego Padres. On July 7, Ramirez was ejected by homeplate umpire John Hirschbeck after throwing his elbow guard in the air after being called out on strikes. Instead of causing conflict, Ramirez walked into the dugout where he remained the rest of the game.

On July 21, Ramirez hit his 537th career home run, passing Mickey Mantle for 15th place on the all-time home run list. On July 30, The New York Times reported that Ramirez tested positive for performance-enhancing drugs during Major League Baseball's 2003 survey testing. Ramirez, a member of the Boston Red Sox at the time, was among 104 major league players to test positive. Manny finished 2009 with a .290 batting average, 19 home runs, and 63 RBI in 104 games. He added a home run and 4 RBI in the 2009 MLB postseason (batting .281), but the Dodgers were again eliminated by the Philadelphia Phillies in the NLCS.

==== 2010 ====
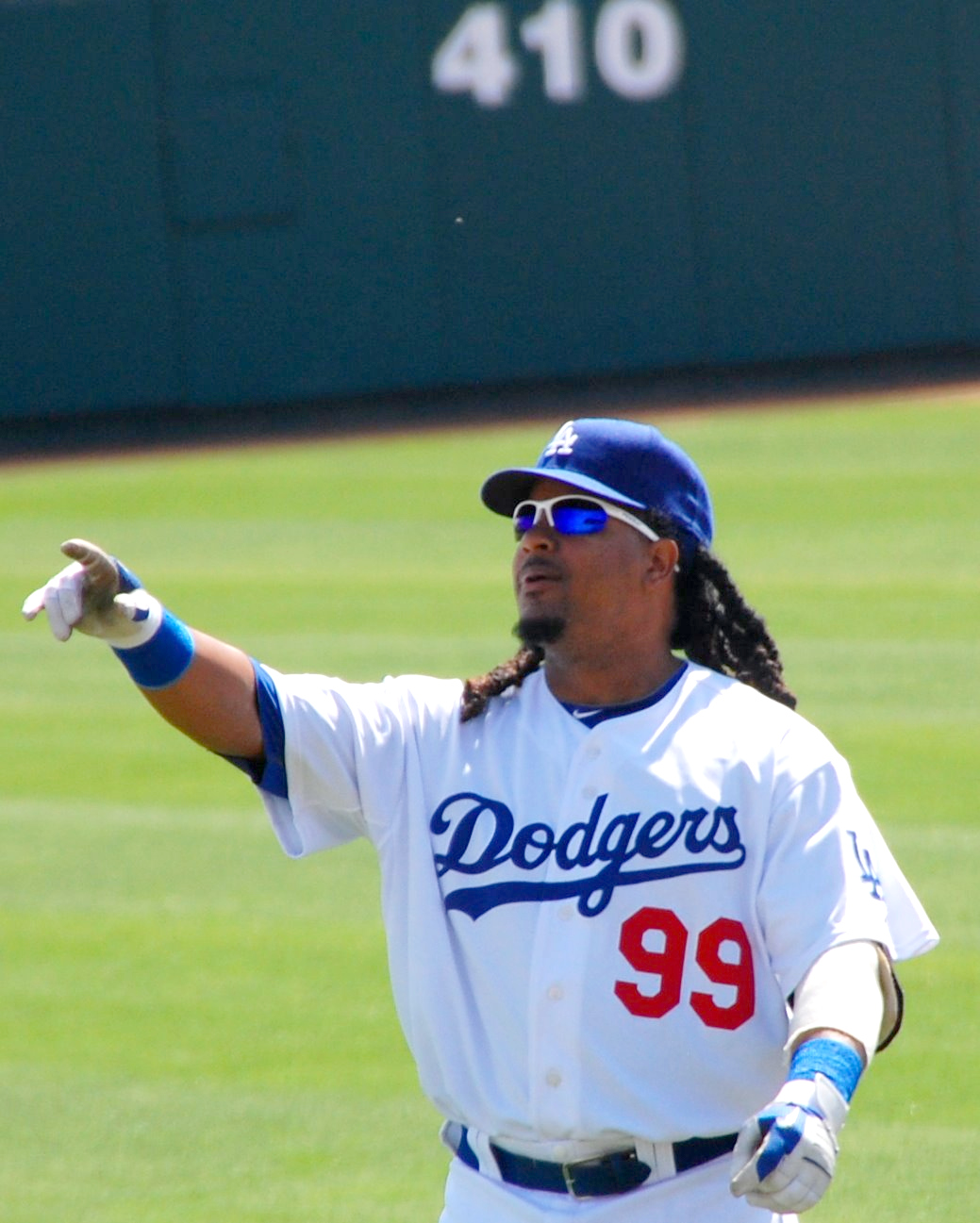
Ramirez in 2010

On April 10, 2010, Ramirez recorded his 2,500th career base hit with an infield single against the Florida Marlins. On April 18 against the San Francisco Giants, Ramirez hit his 548th career home run to tie Mike Schmidt for the 14th place on the all-time home run list. He hit his 549th to pass Schmidt on May 28 against the Colorado Rockies. On June 19, he hit a home run in his second game back at Fenway Park.

In 2010, Ramirez had three separate stints on the disabled list. When he returned from the third trip on August 21, he apparently had lost his starting job to Scott Podsednik. As a pinch hitter, he was ejected on August 29 by home plate umpire Gary Cederstrom one pitch into his at-bat for arguing a strike call. That appearance was his final one in a Dodger uniform. He batted .311 with eight home runs and 40 RBI in only 66 games as a Dodger in 2010 before being placed on waivers.

=== Chicago White Sox (2010) ===
After being placed on waivers by the Dodgers, Ramirez was claimed by the Chicago White Sox. The Dodgers awarded Ramirez to the White Sox on August 30, receiving no prospects, but with the White Sox assuming the $3.8 million remaining on Ramirez's salary. At the time, the White Sox hoped to bolster their offense for a playoff push. However, Ramirez hit .261 with just one home run and 2 RBI in his 24 games with the White Sox. He became a free agent at the conclusion of the season, which ended with the White Sox finishing 88-74, six games out of first place in the AL Central, and missing the postseason.

=== Tampa Bay Rays (2011) ===
On January 21, 2011, Ramirez agreed to a one-year, $2 million deal with the Tampa Bay Rays, who also signed his former Red Sox teammate Johnny Damon in a package deal suggested by agent Scott Boras.

The signing initially looked like a bargain as Ramirez was among the better hitters in spring training, hitting .311 with three home runs and 10 RBI. However, the 38-year-old Ramirez abruptly retired on April 8, 2011, after batting .059 (1-for-17) in his first five games with no home runs and a single RBI. Ramirez reportedly tested positive for a banned performance-enhancing drug in spring training. His first sample, or A sample, was retested and again returned a positive result. Ramirez filed a notice to appeal, and his second sample, or B sample, was tested under observation by Ramirez' representatives. When the B sample also tested positive, he dropped the appeal and told MLB that he would immediately retire.

MLB issued a statement that Ramirez had been informed of an issue under the Joint Drug Prevention and Treatment program, and chose to retire rather than continue with the appeal process. Ramirez was facing a 100-game suspension, which would still apply if he decided to return to MLB in the future. Neither Ramirez nor the MLB Players Association issued a statement about the sudden retirement. Ramirez did not personally inform the Rays about his decision. The team announced that they had been informed of his retirement by the MLB Commissioner's Office.

=== Reinstatement ===
In September 2011, reports surfaced that Ramirez was planning on playing in the Dominican Winter League for the Cibao Eagles. In a statement, the team said that Ramirez hoped to motivate other MLB stars to play in the country. However, the MLB Commissioner's Office issued a statement that since the Dominican League is affiliated with MLB, Ramirez was not eligible to play without first serving his mandated suspension.

Upon hearing that his plans to play in the winter league would not work, Ramirez decided that he was willing to serve his 100-game suspension for the second violation of the drug policy, and to request reinstatement with MLB. He stated that he was not prepared for retirement, that he was available for any MLB team, and if none showed interest, then he would "play in Japan or some other place."

On December 4, it was announced that Ramirez had formally filed papers with the league to be reinstated to baseball and that an agreement had been reached between MLB and the Players Association that he needed to serve only a 50-game suspension instead of 100 games.

=== Late career ===
==== Oakland Athletics system (2012) ====
On February 20, 2012, Ramirez signed a minor league contract with the Oakland Athletics. The deal called for a $500,000 salary if he made the MLB roster. However, he needed to serve his 50-game suspension before he could play for the team. He was eligible to play on May 30, 2012. With the Sacramento River Cats he hit .302 in 17 games, but had no homers and only a .349 slugging percentage. On June 15, Ramirez requested and was given his outright release by the Athletics.

==== EDA Rhinos (2013) ====
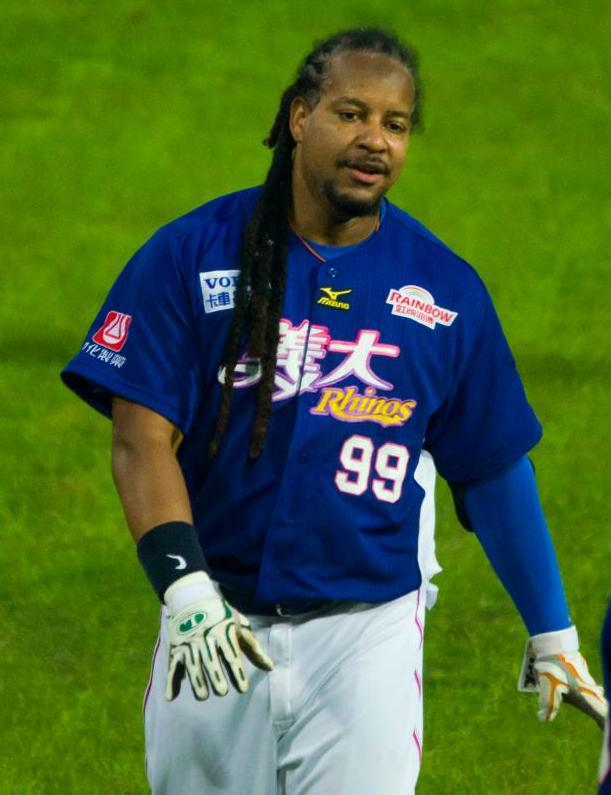
Ramirez playing baseball in Taiwan.

Ramirez played in the Dominican Professional Baseball League during the 2012–13 offseason, registering a .793 OPS for the Águilas Cibaeñas. He signed with the newly renamed EDA Rhinos of the Chinese Professional Baseball League in Taiwan for the 2013 season. He made his debut on March 27 against Brother Elephants. In 49 games, Ramirez batted .352 with eight home runs and 43 RBI, placing him in the top three in all categories. On June 19, 2013, Ramirez opted out of his contract with the Rhinos, stating that he wanted to be closer to his family.

==== Texas Rangers system (2013) ====
Ramirez signed a minor league deal on July 3, 2013, with the Texas Rangers. He was assigned to the Round Rock Express of the Triple-A Pacific Coast League (PCL). After noticing a decrease in Ramirez' bat speed, which resulted in a lack of power, the Rangers released Ramirez on August 13.

==== Chicago Cubs system (2014–2016) and coaching ====
Ramirez signed a minor league deal with the Chicago Cubs on May 25, 2014, to serve as a player-coach for the Iowa Cubs, Chicago's Triple-A affiliate in the PCL. Ramirez hit a two-run home run in his first Iowa home game at Principal Park on June 30, 2014. Cubs prospects Arismendy Alcántara and Javier Báez credited Ramirez for his help with their swings. Báez also viewed Ramirez as a good mentor because of how Ramirez comforted him after the loss of his uncle. On August 23, Ramirez sustained a knee injury. A week later, Iowa manager Marty Pevey announced that Ramirez was going to Arizona for an MRI. With only four games left in Iowa's season, Pevey said that Ramirez was no longer going to coach and play for the team. Pevey said that he was uncertain about Ramirez plans for the next season, as he thought that Ramirez disliked the travel associated with Triple-A baseball.

On February 24, 2015, the Cubs announced that Ramirez was hired as a hitting consultant, and that he would split time between Chicago and Triple-A Iowa. In 2016, Ramirez was a hitting consultant for the Cubs.

==== Kōchi Fighting Dogs (2017) ====
On January 8, 2017, Japanese independent league team Kōchi Fighting Dogs of the Shikoku Island League Plus announced that they had reached an agreement with Ramirez to play for them in 2017. He left the team on August 17 to return to the United States for treatment of a knee injury.

==== 2018–2021 ====
in April 2020, Ramirez expressed interest in returning to the Chinese Professional Baseball League but was not offered a contract by a team. He later expressed interest in playing winter baseball for the New Zealand-based Auckland Tuatara of the Australian Baseball League (ABL) if the league's season was not cancelled due to the COVID-19 pandemic.

On August 29, 2020, Ramirez signed a one-year deal with the ABL's Sydney Blue Sox to be a player-coach. Adam Dobb, the owner of the Blue Sox, would not disclose the details of Ramirez' contract, other than to say he would be earning much less than he did playing in MLB. During an interview, Ramirez said he envisioned his role mainly as a coach to the team's young players. He also said he was happy to be playing in Sydney, "I could’ve gone to the Dominican Republic, where I’ve played, but I wanted to try something different. The city is beautiful. The city’s on the water. It’s unbelievable."

On January 11, 2021, Ramirez was released by the Blue Sox without making an appearance due to the uncertainty of the season due to COVID-19 and an ongoing medical problem preventing Ramirez from playing or training with the team.

=== Career statistics ===
G	AB	R	H	2B	3B	HR	RBI	BB	AVG	OBP	SLG	OPS	TB	Fld%
2302	8244	1544	2574	547	20	555	1831	1329	.312	.411	.585	.996	4826	.978

=== Postseason statistics ===
G	AB	R	H	2B	HR	RBI	BB	AVG	OBP	SLG	OPS	TB
111	410	67	117	19	29	78	72	.285	.394	.544	.937	223

== Personal life ==
On May 10, 2004, Ramirez missed a Red Sox game to become a naturalized citizen of the United States. He entered the next game running onto the field to a standing ovation while carrying a small American flag held in his hand. He gave the flag to a fan to the left outfield corner of the field, in the shadow of the Green Monster.

Ramirez has three sons: one from a previous relationship, and two with his wife Juliana. As of August 2015, he and his family reside in Weston, Florida.

All three of his sons have had experience playing baseball at a high level. The elder Manny Jr. played college baseball for the University of San Francisco from 2015–17, appearing in just shy of 100 games across his time at USF. Manuelito (who also goes by Manny Ramirez Jr.) is a freshman at East Los Angeles College, where he plays baseball. The youngest son, Lucas, is committed to play baseball for the University of Tennessee. As of July 2024, both the younger Manny and Lucas are outfielders for the Victoria Harbourcats, a summer collegiate baseball team in the West Coast League. Lucas was drafted by the Los Angeles Angels in the 17th round of the 2024 Major League Baseball draft.

In September 2011, Ramirez was accused of slapping his wife and charged in Florida with misdemeanor battery. Ramirez admitted only to grabbing her shoulders during an argument. Authorities dropped the charges in March 2012 because his wife refused to cooperate with the prosecution.

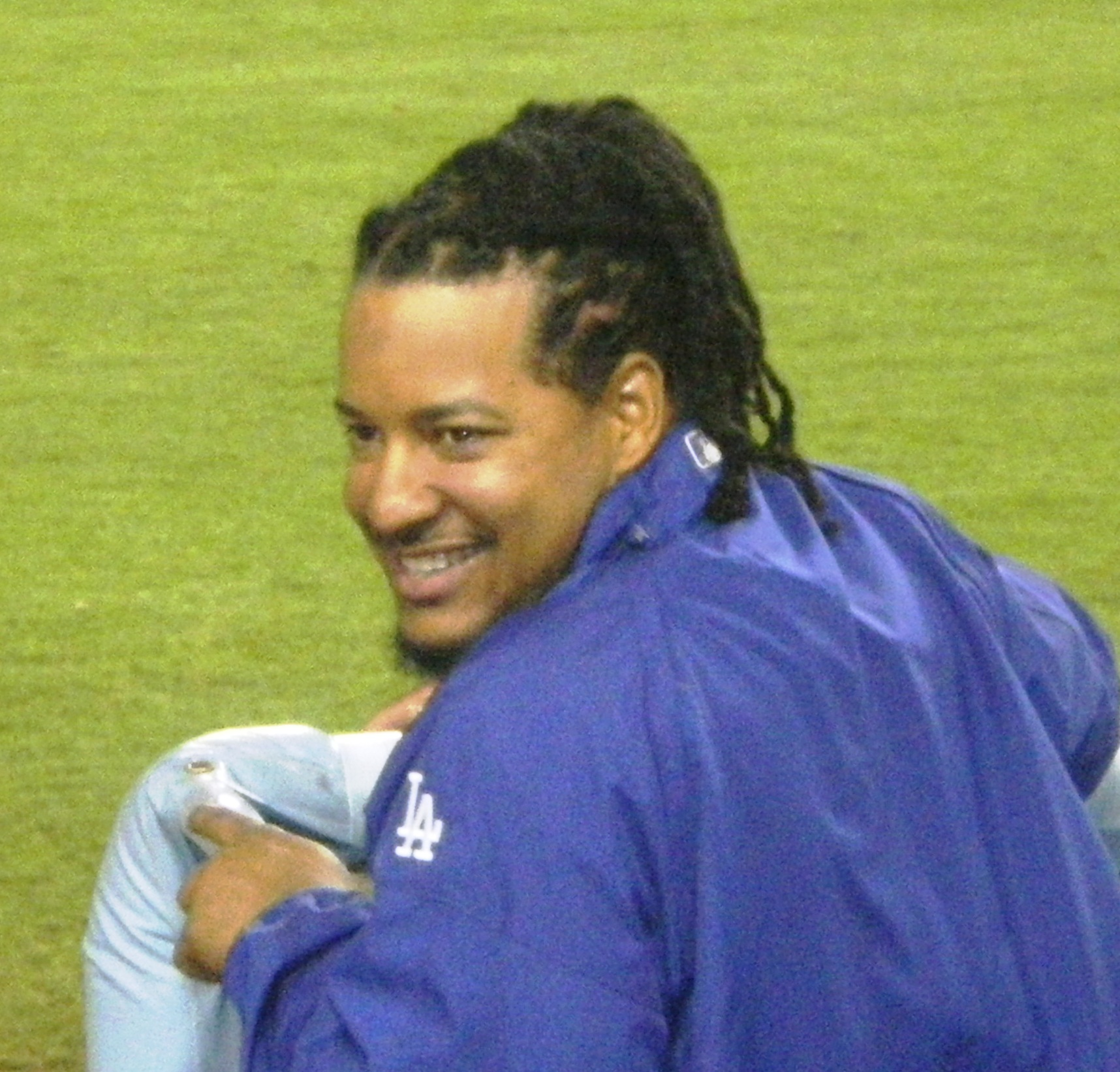
Ramirez at Dodger Stadium on September 25, 2008, after the Dodgers clinched the NL West Division title

Ramirez has often attracted attention on and off the field for his quirky and often fun-loving behavior and attitude, which is sometimes at odds with MLB's more serious and traditional culture. These incidents are colloquially known as "Manny Moments" or, more commonly, "Manny Being Manny". Instances of this behavior include inducing his Red Sox teammates, including Ellis Burks, to drink alcohol which he had spiked with Viagra, wearing Oakley THUMP while playing the outfield, disappearing through a door in the Green Monster to use the bathroom, diving to intercept a throw from teammate Johnny Damon in the outfield which had been intended for the infield, selling his barbecue grill on eBay, and high fiving a fan after a catch at the outfield wall before throwing the ball back to the infield to complete a double play. The first known documented usage of the phrase "Manny Being Manny" is attributed to then-Indians manager Mike Hargrove, quoted in a 1995 Newsday article.

Ramirez also built a reputation, despite his quirky behavior, of being someone who was a tireless worker at his hitting. He was known for long batting practice and tee sessions as well as constantly reviewing video of his swings and of opposing pitchers. However, while in the batters box during games, he kept his approach extremely simple, relying on the muscle memory and pitch recognition from his training regimen. He was known, at times, to verbally simplify his approach in the batters box to merely "seeing the ball".

In 2000, the Boston Red Sox signed Manny Ramirez to an eight-year, $160 million deal. As a part of the deal, there were $32 million in deferred payments that are owed to Ramirez, who will earn $1.968 million per year from 2011 to 2026.

== Career highlights ==
- Honors
  - 12x All-Star (1995, 1998–2008)
  - 9x Silver Slugger Award (1995, 1999–2006)
  - 2x Hank Aaron Award (1999, 2004)
  - World Series MVP Award (2004)
  - Member of Major League Baseball's Latino Legends Team
- Led League
  - AL batting crown (2002, .349)
  - Led AL in home runs (2004, 43)
  - Led AL in RBIs (1999, 165)
  - 3x led AL in slugging percentage (1999–2000, 2004)
  - 3x led AL in OPS (1999–2000, 2004)
  - 3x led AL in on-base percentage (2002–03, 2006)
  - 2x led AL in intentional walks (2001, 2003)
- League Top-Ten
  - 9x Top 10 AL in home runs (1998–2006)
  - 8x Top 10 AL in total bases (1996–99, 2001, 2003–05)
  - 8x Top 10 AL MVP (1998–2005)
  - 8x Top 10 AL in RBIs (1995, 1998, 1999–2001, 2004–05)
  - 6x Top 10 AL in times on base (1997, 1999, 2003–05)
  - 5x Top 10 AL hitters (1997, 1999–2000, 2003, 2006)
- Career rankings on All-Time lists (as of April 8, 2011, when he retired)
  - 29 post-season home runs – 1st
  - 78 post-season RBIs – 1st
  - 21 grand slams – 3rd
  - .5854 slugging average – 9th
  - 0.9960 OPS – 9th
  - 216 intentional walks – 11th
  - 1,122 extra base hits – 13th
  - 1,813 strikeouts – 13th
  - 14.9 at bats per home run – 13th
  - 555 home runs – 15th
  - 1,831 RBIs – 18th
  - 547 doubles – 24th
  - 4,826 total bases – 26th
  - .4106 on-base percentage – 32nd
  - 243 double plays grounded into – 32nd
  - .3122 batting average – 87th
- Postseason
  - 2x World Series Champion (Boston, 2004, 2007)
  - Tied with Pete Rose for longest LCS hitting streak (15)
- Other
  - 9 straight seasons of at least 30 HRs and 100 RBIs (1998–2006, tied for 3rd-longest in history)
  - 27-game hitting streak in 2006
  - Hit 500th home run on May 31, 2008, vs. Baltimore Orioles off Chad Bradford.

=== National Baseball Hall of Fame consideration ===
Ramirez first appeared on balloting for the National Baseball Hall of Fame in 2017, when he received 23.8% of the vote, falling short of the 75% required for election. His history with PEDs has been the factor that has prevented him from being inducted. In 2026, his tenth and final appearance on the BBWAA ballot, he received 38.8%, falling short of the necessary threshold.

== Publicity ==
Ramirez had been featured on the covers of the Sega Genesis video game World Series Baseball '96 and the EA Sports video game MVP Baseball 2005.

== See also ==
- List of Boston Red Sox awards
- List of highest paid baseball players
- List of Silver Slugger Award winners at designated hitter
- List of Silver Slugger Award winners at outfield
- List of Major League Baseball career home run leaders
- List of Major League Baseball career hits leaders
- List of Major League Baseball career doubles leaders
- List of Major League Baseball career runs scored leaders
- List of Major League Baseball career runs batted in leaders
- List of Major League Baseball career total bases leaders
- List of Major League Baseball home run records
- List of Major League Baseball runs batted in records
- List of Major League Baseball annual runs batted in leaders
- List of Major League Baseball batting champions
- List of Major League Baseball annual home run leaders
- 500 home run club

Awards and achievements
Preceded by Frank Thomas; Albert Belle; Jason Giambi; Alex Rodriguez	American League Player of the Month; May 1995; April 1999; April 2001; September 2002	Succeeded by Edgar Martínez; Nomar Garciaparra; Jason Giambi; Alfonso Soriano
Preceded by Ryan Braun	National League Player of the Month; August 2008	Succeeded by Ryan Howard
Preceded by Jim Thome	Indians' Minor League Player of the Year (the Lou Boudreau Award); 1991	Succeeded by Ken Ramos
