= Thumper =

Thumper or The Thumper may refer to:

== In arts and entertainment ==
=== Film and television ===
- Thumper (Bambi), a rabbit in the Disney animated film Bambi
- Thumper (Dune), a mechanical device in the science fiction novel Dune
- Thumper (film), a 2017 crime thriller by Jordan Ross
- Thumper, Hopper's pet grasshopper in A Bug's Life
- Thumper, a character in the James Bond film Diamonds Are Forever
- Thumper, a character in the television show Veronica Mars

=== Gaming ===
- Thumper (video game), a 2016 rhythm game by Drool
- Thumper, a character from the Twisted Metal video game series
- Coal thumper, a building from the Frostpunk computer game.

=== Literature ===
- Thumper (Dune), a mechanical device in the science fiction novel Dune

=== Music ===
- Thumper (EP), a 1990 EP by Man in the Wood
- "Thumper" (song), a 2010 song by band Enter Shikari
- "Thumper", a song by Raging Speedhorn on the album Raging Speedhorn
- The Thumper, a 1960 album by Jimmy Heath
- Thumper (band), an Irish rock band

== Technology ==
- Thumper (motorcycle), a four-stroke single cylinder motorcycle
- Project Thumper, the earliest official anti-ballistic missile study
- M79 grenade launcher (nickname Thumper)
- Sun Fire X4500, storage server (code name Thumper)
- Thumper, a collecting pot placed along the vapor-carrying line before the worm of a pot still
- Thumper, one of the two Avro Lancaster bombers in flying condition, in the BBMF Museum at Coningsby RAF station
- Thumper, a small arms ammunition concept popularized by gun writer Jeff Cooper
- Thumper, a casual term for a seismic vibrator that causes vibrations in the earth ("thumping") that are recorded for reflection seismology.

== Other uses ==
- Bible thumper, Christian fundamentalists (normally considered derogatory)
- Thumper (magic trick), a device used in a variety of magic tricks
- British Rail Class 205, Nicknamed “thumpers” due to their engine sound

== See also ==
- Thump (disambiguation)
- Thumping
