= Thump =

Thump may refer to:

- Thump (Vice), a music and culture channel of the magazine Vice
- Thump Records, US record label
- Oakley THUMP, a model of sunglasses with an MP3 player
- Keith Belton (born 1981), nicknamed Thump, American football player

== See also ==
- Thumper (disambiguation)
- Thumping, a method of killing farm animals using blunt force trauma
- Thumps, a horse disease
