= Seismic source =

Device that generates controlled seismic energy used for seismic surveys

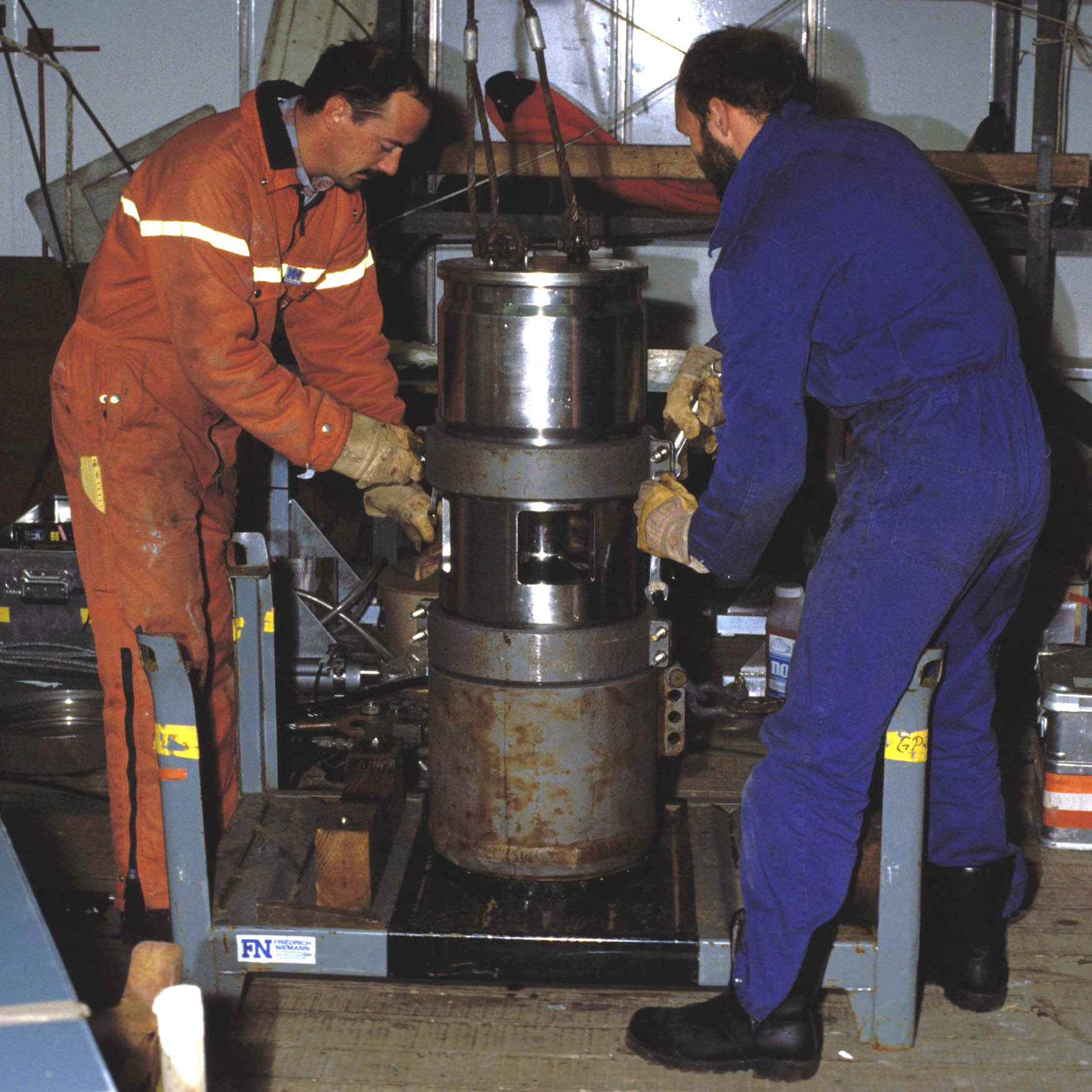
An air gun seismic source (30 litre)

A seismic source is a device that generates controlled seismic energy used to perform both reflection and refraction seismic surveys. A seismic source can be simple, such as dynamite, or it can use more sophisticated technology, such as a specialized air gun. Seismic sources can provide single pulses or continuous sweeps of energy, generating seismic waves, which travel through a medium such as water or layers of rocks. Some of the waves then reflect and refract and are recorded by receivers, such as geophones or hydrophones.

Seismic sources may be used to investigate shallow subsoil structure, for engineering site characterization, or to study deeper structures, either in the search for petroleum and mineral deposits, or to map subsurface faults or for other scientific investigations. The returning signals from the sources are detected by seismic sensors (geophones or hydrophones) in known locations relative to the position of the source. The recorded signals are then subjected to specialist processing and interpretation to yield comprehensible information about the subsurface.

== Source model ==
A seismic source signal has the following characteristics:

1. Generates an impulse signal
2. Band-limited
3. The generated waves are time-varying

The generalized equation that shows all above properties is:

$$s(t)=\beta e^{-\alpha t^2} \sin(2 \pi f_{max} t)$$

where $f_{max}$ is the maximum frequency component of the generated waveform.

== Types of sources ==
=== Sledgehammer ===
The most basic seismic source is a sledgehammer. A seismic energy is generated either by striking the ground directly, or more commonly striking a metal or polyethylene plate on the ground. Typically applied for near-surface seismic refraction surveys. Impact of sledgehammer contact with the surface can provide sufficient seismic energy for interface depths up to 30 m or more, depending on geological conditions and physical properties.

=== Explosives ===
Explosives most widely used as seismic sources are known as gelatin dynamites. These dynamites are placed into three subcategories, straight gelatins in which nitroglycerin, also known as glyceryl trinitrate with the chemical formula C_{3}H_{5}(ONO_{2})_{3} is the active component, ammonia gelatins in which ammonia nitrite with chemical formula NH_{4}NO_{3} as the active component, and semi gelatins in which the composition consists mostly of nitroglycerin.

Upon detonation, explosives release large volumes of expanding gas very quickly, forcing great pressure to the surroundings in the form of seismic waves.

Using explosives as seismic sources has been in practice for decades because of the reliability and energy efficiency they provide. Such sources are most commonly used on land and swampy environments because of high thickness in sediments. Typical charge sizes used in the field for reflection surveys are 0.25 kg to 100 kg for single hole sources, 0.25 kg to 250 kg or more for multiple hole sources, and may reach 2500 kg or more for refraction surveys.

Though dynamites and other explosives are efficient seismic sources because of their reduced costs, ease of transport in difficult terrains, and lack of regular maintenance compared to other sources, the use of explosives is becoming restricted in certain areas, causing decline and increasing popularity for alternative seismic sources.

For instance, hexanitrostilbene was the main explosive fill in the thumper mortar round canisters used as part of the Apollo Lunar Active Seismic Experiments. Generally, the explosive charges are placed between 6 and 76 metres (20 and 250 ft) below ground, in a hole that is drilled with dedicated drilling equipment for this purpose. This type of seismic drilling is often referred to as "Shot Hole Drilling". A common drill rig used for "Shot Hole Drilling" is the ARDCO C-1000 drill mounted on an ARDCO K 4X4 buggy. These drill rigs often use water or air to assist the drilling.

=== Air gun ===
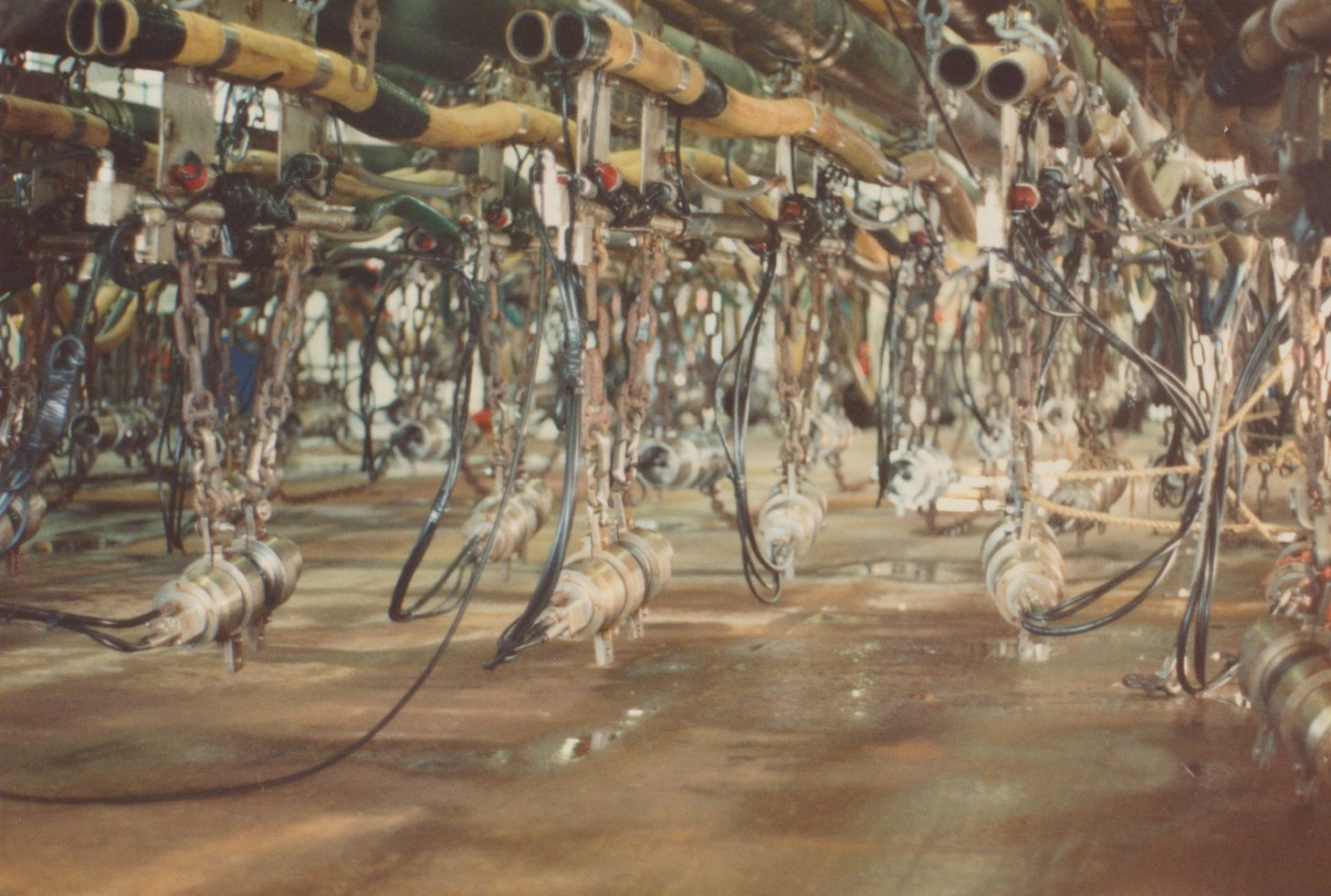
Litton LP air gun strings using in marine seismic acquisition

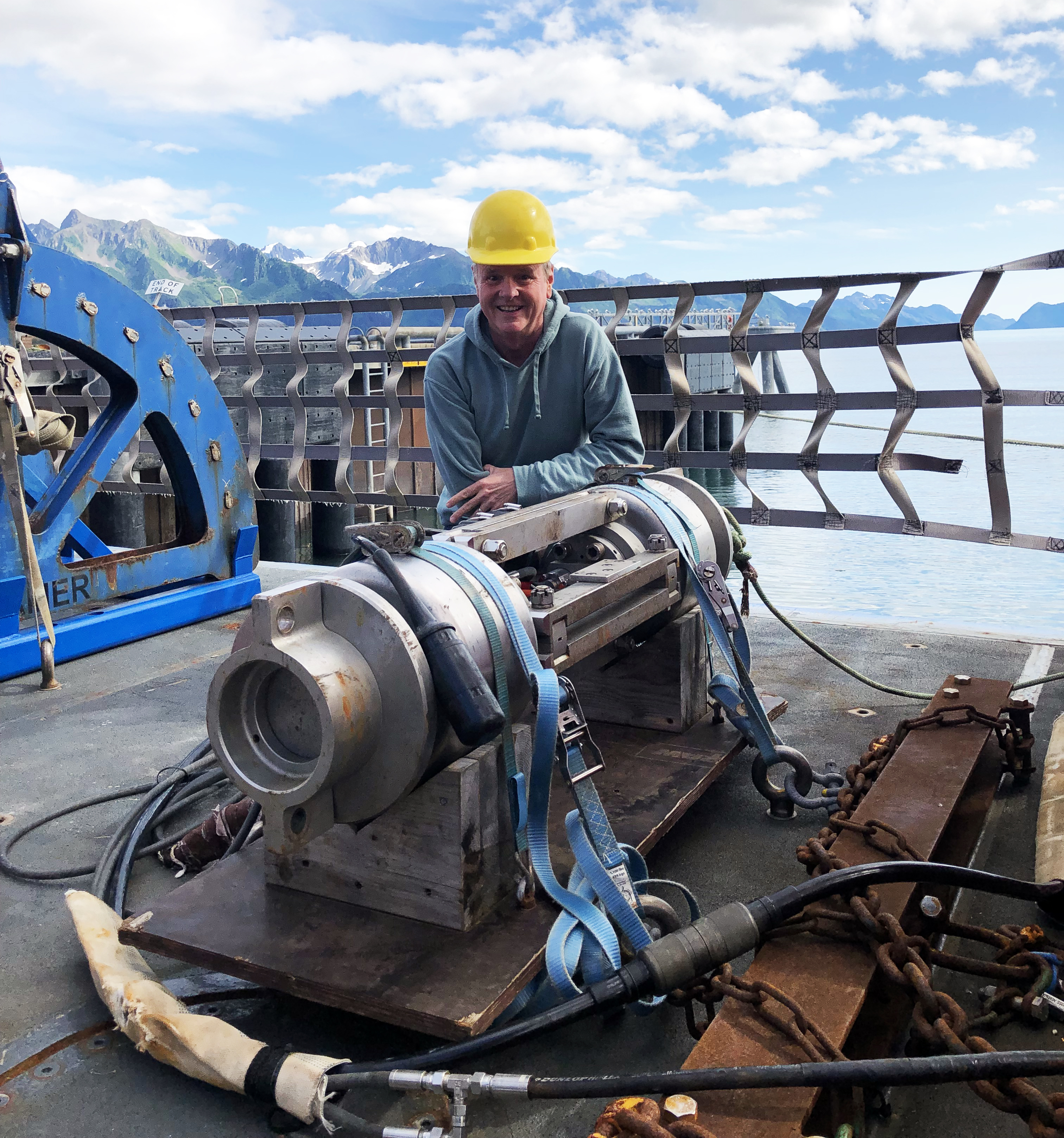
Seismologist with 18 liter air gun array secured for transport aboard the R/V Sikuliaq

An air gun is used for marine reflection and refraction surveys. It consists of one or more pneumatic chambers that are pressurized with compressed air at pressures from 14 to 21 MPa (2000 to 3000 lbf/in^{2}). Air guns are submerged below the water surface and towed behind a seismic ship. When an air gun is fired, a solenoid is triggered that releases high pressure air from one chamber to the back of a shuttle that is normally held in balance between the two equally pressurised chambers. The instant lowering of air pressure in the first chamber allows the shuttle to move rapidly into the first chamber, releasing a high pressure air reservoir that is behind the shuttle in the second chamber through ports directly into the sea producing a pulse of acoustic energy. Air gun arrays may consist of up to 48 individual air guns with different size chambers or certain air guns volumes may be clustered together. The firing of all of the array is controlled by gun controller and is usually done to within a ± 1 or 2 millisecond tolerance, the aim being to create the optimum initial shock wave followed by the minimum reverberation of the air bubble(s). Since the shuttle is magnetised, the rapid movement into the first chamber on releasing the solenoid value provides a small current that is in effect a timing signal for the firing gun that is returned to the gun controller. A near-field hydrophone located at a known measured distance from the gun port can also be used to time the first break signal into the hydrophone for accurate gun timing verification.

Air gun maintenance is important as guns can misfire; the worst case scenario being an auto-fire where the gun actually fires repeatedly out of synch because of a defect in the gun itself such as a damaged solenoid valve or a leaking gun O-ring. A single auto-firing gun can result in the total array bubble signature becoming corrupted and if undetected, can result in many seismic lines being re-shot just for one auto-firing gun when the fault is found during initial data processing.

During normal handling for deployment and recovery, air guns must never be fully pressurised to their optimum working pressure on deck and it is normal practice to air down guns to 500 psi to prevent water ingress on deployment and recovery. It is also a poor and dangerous practice to test fire guns on deck in the air at pressure. There must also be an isolation system in place to prevent the accidental firing of guns on deck by observers or navigators by mistake. High pressure air releases on deck can amputate fingers and also result in a high pressure injection injury through the skin, an almost untreatable and deadly injury in a seismic environment. Gunners should wear the required personal protective equipment to protect their eyes and their hearing and minimise exposure of uncovered skin.

Air guns are made from the highest grades of corrosion resistant stainless steel. Large chambers (i.e., greater than 1 L or 70 cu in) tend to give low frequency signals, and the small chambers (less than 1 L) give higher frequency signals.

=== Plasma sound source ===
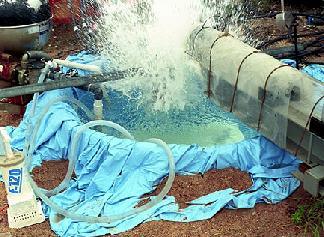
Plasma sound source fired in small swimming pool

A plasma sound source (PSS), otherwise called a spark gap sound source, or simply a sparker, is a means of making a very low frequency sonar pulse underwater. For each firing, electric charge is stored in a large high-voltage bank of capacitors, and then released in an arc across electrodes in the water. The underwater spark discharge produces a high-pressure plasma and vapor bubble, which expands and collapses, making a loud sound. Most of the sound produced is between 20 and 200 Hz, useful for both seismic and sonar applications.

There are also plans to use PSS as a non-lethal weapon against submerged divers.

=== Thumper truck ===
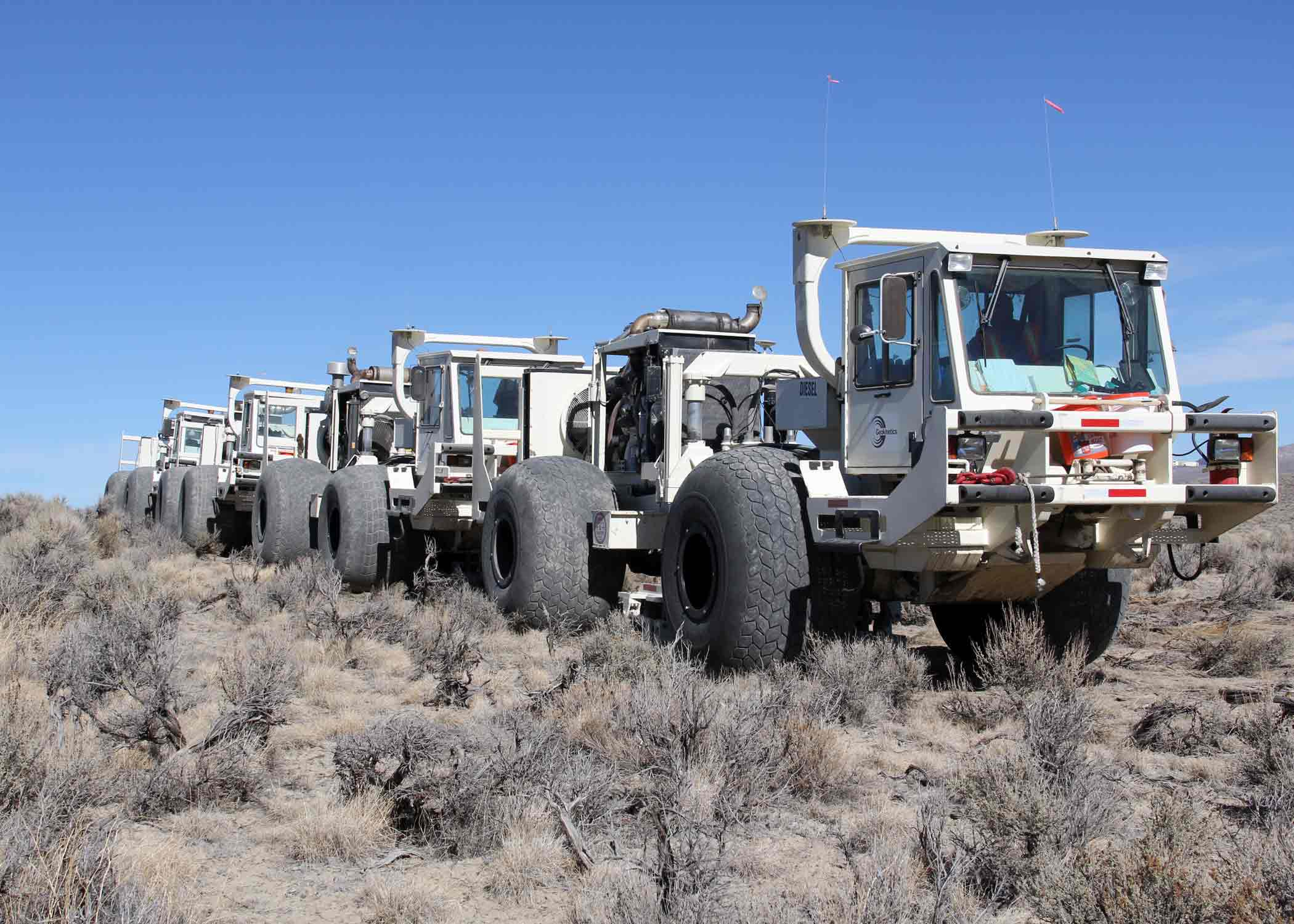
Thumper trucks, Noble Energy, northern Nevada 2012

In 1953, the weight dropping thumper technique was introduced as an alternative to dynamite sources.

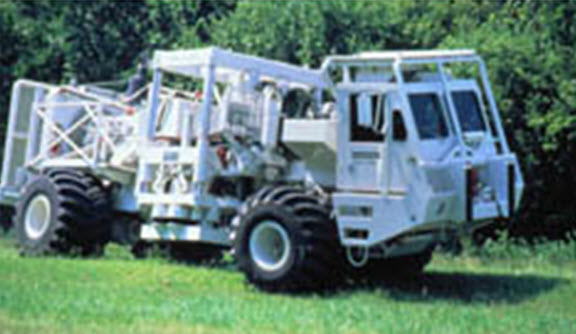
Vibroseis

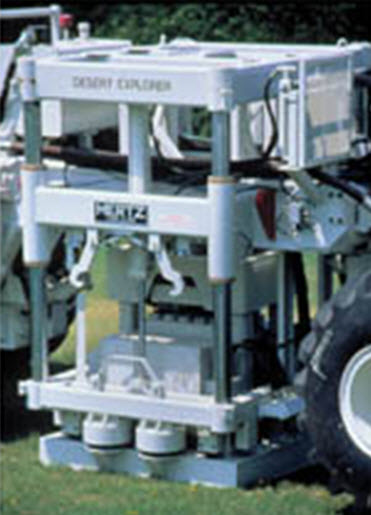
Vibroseis 2

Seismic vibrator during operation

A thumper truck (or weight-drop) truck is a vehicle-mounted ground impact system that can be used to provide a seismic source. A heavy weight is raised by a hoist at the back of the truck and dropped, generally about three meters, to impact (or "thump") the ground. To augment the signal, the weight may be dropped more than once at the same spot, the signal may also be increased by thumping at several nearby places in an array whose dimensions may be chosen to enhance the seismic signal by spatial filtering.

More advanced thumpers use a technology called "Accelerated Weight Drop" (AWD), where a high pressure gas (min 7 MPa (1000 lbf/in^{2})) is used to accelerate a heavy weight hammer (5,000 kg (11,000 lb)) to hit a base plate coupled to the ground from a distance of 2 to 3 metres (6 ft 7 in to 9 ft 10 in). Several thumps are stacked to enhance signal to noise ratio. AWD allows both more energy and more control of the source than gravitational weight-drop, providing better depth penetration, control of signal frequency content.

Thumping may be less damaging to the environment than firing explosives in shot-holes, though a heavily thumped seismic line with transverse ridges every few meters might create long-lasting disturbance of the soil. An advantage of the thumper (later shared with Vibroseis), especially in politically unstable areas, is that no explosives are required.

=== Electromagnetic Pulse Energy Source (Non-Explosive) ===
EMP sources based on the electrodynamic and electromagnetic principles.

=== Seismic vibrator ===
A seismic vibrator propagates energy signals into the Earth over an extended period of time as opposed to the near instantaneous energy provided by impulsive sources. The data recorded in this way must be correlated to convert the extended source signal into an impulse. The source signal using this method was originally generated by a servo-controlled hydraulic vibrator or shaker unit mounted on a mobile base unit, but electro-mechanical versions have also been developed.

The "Vibroseis" exploration technique was developed by the Continental Oil Company (Conoco) during the 1950s and was a trademark until the company's patent lapsed.

=== Boomer sources ===
Boomer sound sources are used for shallow water seismic surveys, mostly for engineering survey applications. Boomers are towed in a floating sled behind a survey vessel. Similar to the plasma source, a boomer source stores energy in capacitors, but it discharges through a flat spiral coil instead of generating a spark. A copper plate adjacent to the coil flexes away from the coil as the capacitors are discharged. This flexing is transmitted into the water as the seismic pulse.

Originally the storage capacitors were placed in a steel container (the bang box) on the survey vessel. The high voltages used, typically 3,000 V, required heavy cables and strong safety containers. Recently, low voltage boomers have become available. These use capacitors on the towed sled, allowing efficient energy recovery, lower voltage power supplies and lighter cables. The low voltage systems are generally easier to deploy and have fewer safety concerns.

=== Noise sources ===
Correlation-based processing techniques also enable seismologists to image the interior of the Earth at multiple scales using natural (e.g., the oceanic microseism) or artificial (e.g., urban) background noise as a seismic source. For example, under ideal conditions of uniform seismic illumination, the correlation of the noise signals between two seismographs provides an estimate of the bidirectional seismic impulse response.

== See also ==
- Reflection seismology
- Seismic refraction

== Bibliography ==
- Crawford, J. M., Doty, W. E. N. and Lee, M. R., 1960, Continuous signal seismograph: Geophysics, Society of Exploration Geophysicists, 25, 95–105.
- Robert E. Sheriff, Encyclopedic Dictionary of Applied Geophysics (Geophysical References No. 13) 4th Edition, 2002, 429 pag. ISBN 978-1560801184.
- Snieder, Roel (2004-04-29). "Extracting the Green's function from the correlation of coda waves: A derivation based on stationary phase". Physical Review E. 69 (4) 046610. American Physical Society (APS). Bibcode:2004PhRvE..69d6610S. doi:10.1103/physreve.69.046610. ISSN 1539-3755. PMID 15169121.
- Seismic Wave Propagation Modeling and Inversion, Phil Bording
- Derivation of Seismic wave equation can be found here.
