= The Hammer of Eden =

1998 novel by Ken Follett

- First edition (UK)
- Author: Ken Follett
- Language: English
- Genre: Thriller
- Publisher: Pan Macmillan
- Publication date: 1998
- Publication place: United Kingdom
- Media type: Print (hardcover, paperback), CD
- Pages: 448 pp (paperback)
- ISBN: 978-0-449-22754-1
- OCLC: 42828638

The Hammer of Eden is a work by Ken Follett published in 1998.

== Plot ==
It is about a group of people living together in a commune cut off from the rest of the world. When their commune is threatened by a plan to build a dam, they turn desperate and devise a devious plan to arm-twist the governor of California to abandon the project. They transform themselves into eco-terrorists and threaten to start an earthquake if their demands are not met. They set off a series of earthquakes using a stolen seismic vibrator truck from an oil firm. Their leader is an illiterate man called Priest who is helped by a seismology student called Melanie in his plans. Judy Maddox, an FBI agent, is the only one who can stop them and the rest of the story revolves around how she tries to do so.

== List of characters ==
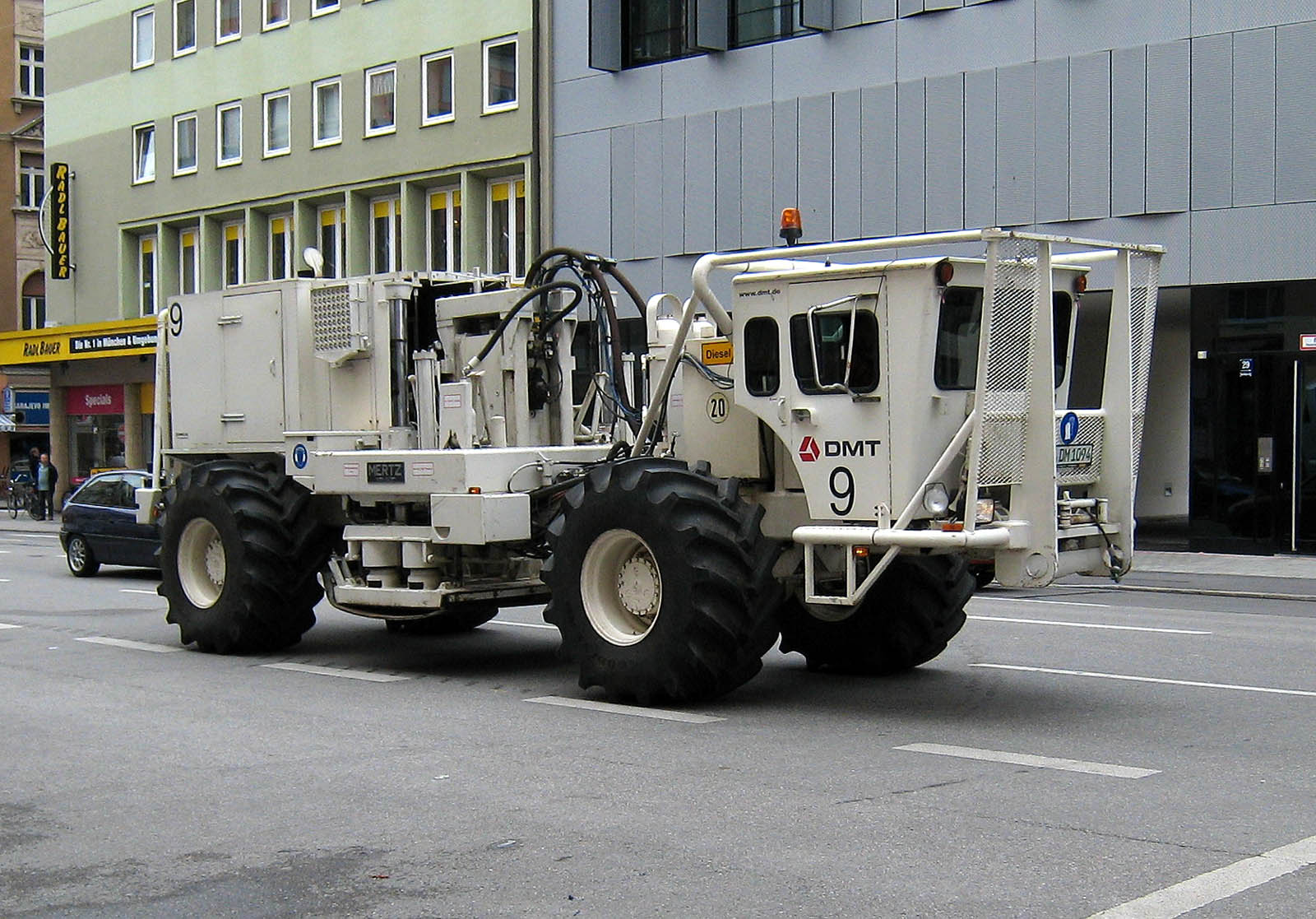
A real seismic vibrator

=== Main characters ===
- Richard "Priest" Granger: leader of the municipality. He does not hesitate to commit a series of murders to succeed in his insane enterprise. Charismatic personality, he manages to easily manipulate both internal and external people. Although he is unable to read or write, he is successful in preventing others from realizing this.
- Judy Maddox: agent of the FBI, of an American father and a Vietnamese mother. As a child she experienced the fear of an earthquake. At the beginning of the book, despite having brilliantly solved a case, she does not get a well-deserved promotion which will instead go to a colleague of hers, a friend of her direct superior. Despite this, faced with the threat of the group The Hammer of Eden Judy manages to emerge and be appreciated by the upper echelons.
- Stella "Star" Higgins: companion of Priest and mother of his oldest child. Stereotype of the classic hippie who, having reached a certain age, behaves as those who contested when she was younger. For example, the relationship between Melanie and Priest suffers greatly, which is not usual among hippies, who support free love.
- Michael Quercus: seismologist, husband of Melanie and father of their son. He suffers the theft by his wife and Priest of the maps which list the seismic points most sensitive to the action of the seismic vibrator. Helps Judy Maddox, with whom he forms a relationship, stop the commune.
- Melanie Quercus: Michael's ex-wife and member of the commune. Weak personality, she needs an authoritative male figure. By playing on her weakness Priest persuades her to do anything.

=== Secondary characters ===
- Dusty Quercus: son of Michael and Melanie, suffering from multiple allergies.
- Bo Maddox: Judy's father and police officer.
- Raja Khan: works in the FBI, Judy's colleague.
- Don Riley: Judy's ex-boyfriend, cheated on her with another woman. Repentant, he tries to get closer to the girl, but she no longer loves him.
- Mike Robson: California governor, gets involved in a vain FBI attempt to set a trap for Priest.
- At Honeymoon: governor's right arm.
- Flower: daughter of Star and Priest, dreams of becoming a writer. She tries to get in touch with the civilized world and she likes fashion and movie stars, so much so that she is arrested for stealing a poster of Leonardo DiCaprio.
- Other members of the hippie commune:
  - Oaktree
  - Dale
  - Poem
  - Aneth
  - Bones

== Reception ==
Carlos Ramet noted that the character of Judy Maddox, one of the novel's main protagonists, is an example of the a change in Follet's writing that begun with The Third Twin, i.e. "the change in emphasis from male to female perspective" and the development of capable and heroical female characters. He also observes that Maddox's contempt for her superiors, described as the "suits" and "the big shot[s]" from Washington", is representative of Follet's "post-war British ambivalence towards American materialism". With regards to the novel structure, Ramet argues that it combines the "formulaic hunter/hunted device" with "Buchanesque and Hitchcockian elements", and also shows inspiration from Ian Fleming's works.
