= Seismic vibrator =

Seismic survey tool

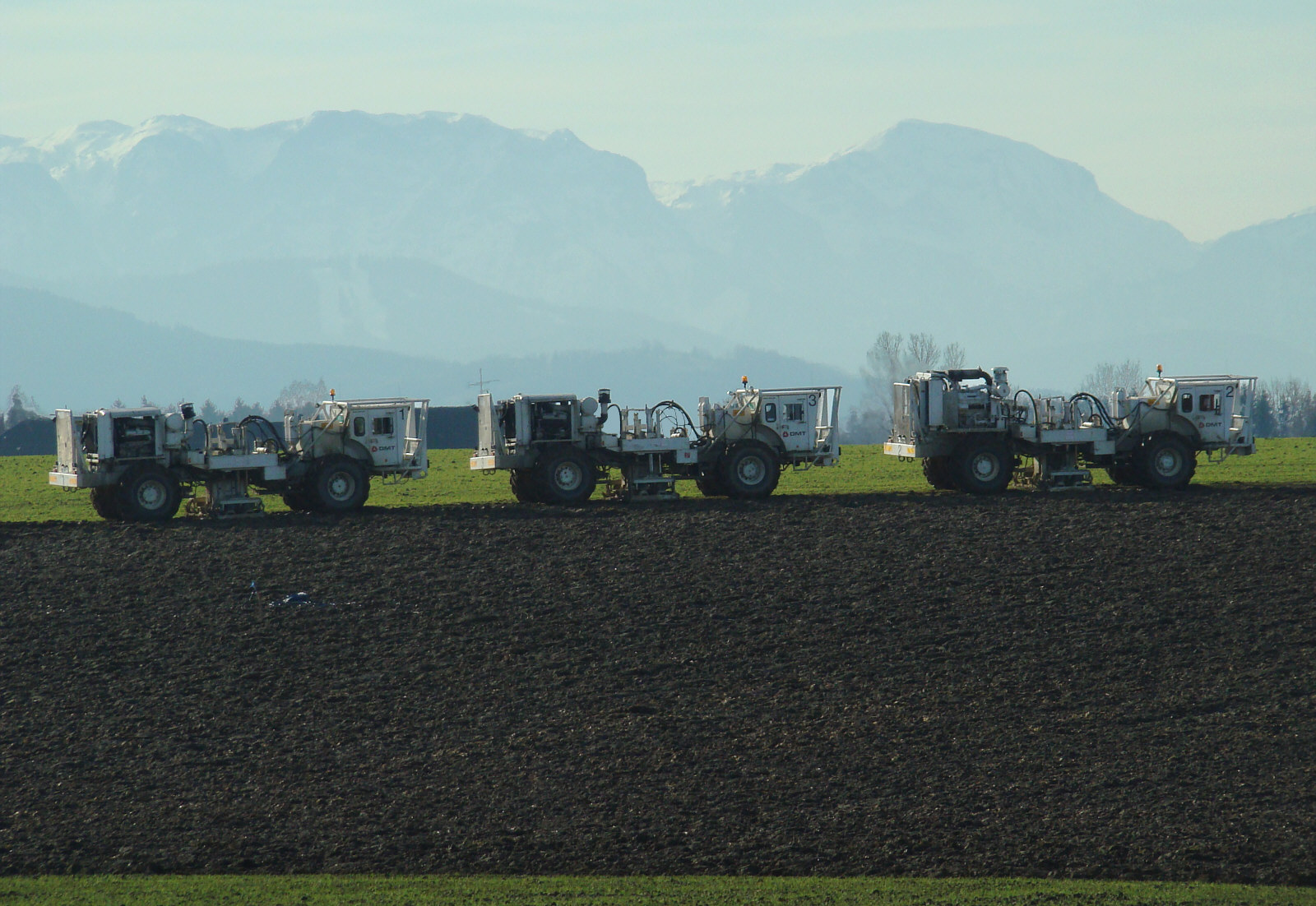
DMT Seismic vibrators during a 3D exploration in Austrian alpine foothills

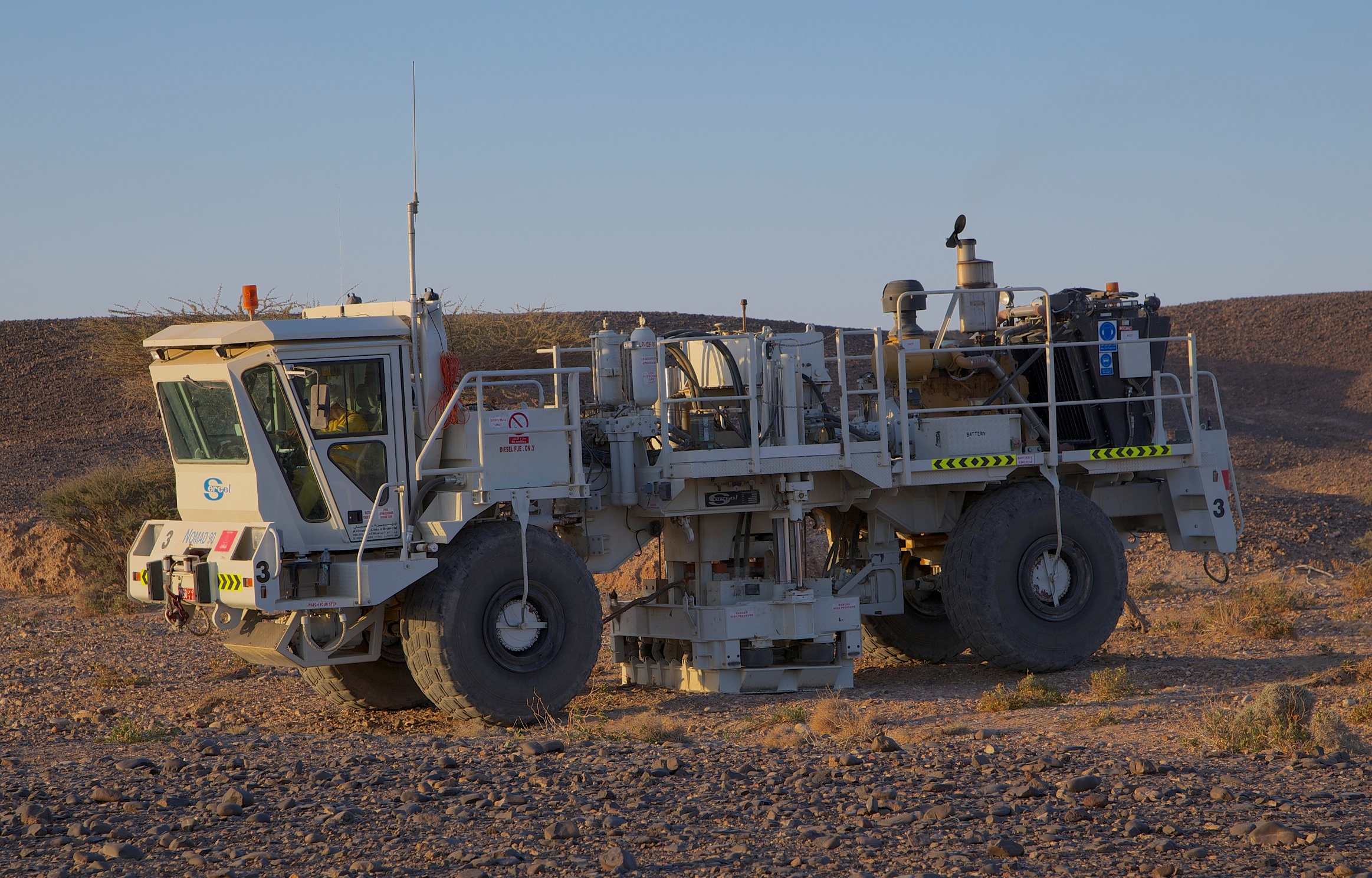
World largest seismic vibrator Nomad 90 during a vibration

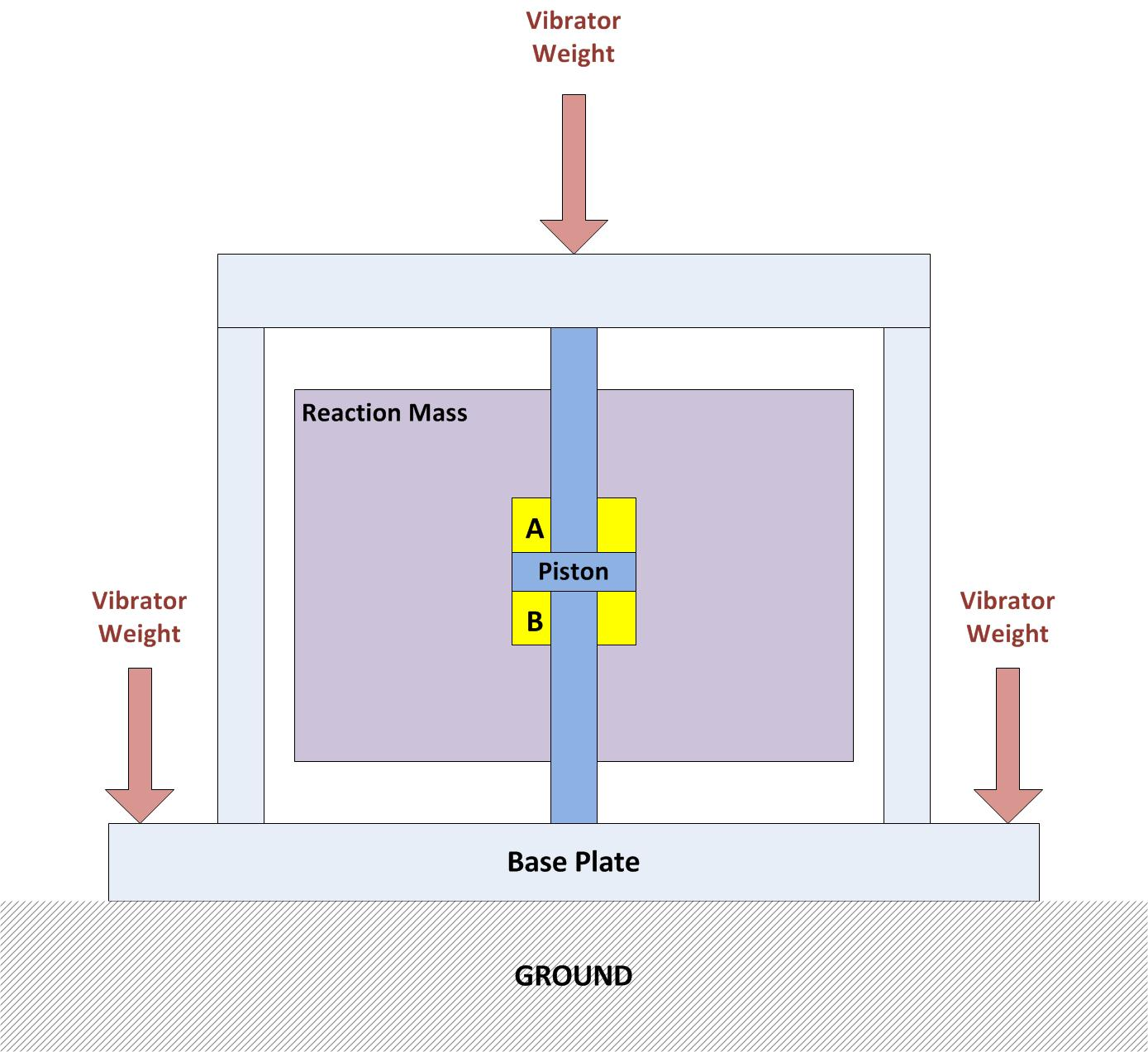
Principle of operation of a seismic vibrator shaker

A seismic vibrator is a truck-mounted or buggy-mounted device that is capable of injecting low-frequency vibrations into the earth. It is one of a number of seismic sources used in reflection seismology. The ‘Vibroseis’ exploration technique (performed with vibrators) was developed by the Continental Oil Company (Conoco) during the 1950s and was a trademark until the company's patent lapsed.

Today, seismic vibrators are used to perform about half of all seismic surveys on land.

The largest seismic vibration truck in the world, known as 'Nomad 90’, weighs 41.5T and has a 90,000 lbf force.

== Principle ==
A seismic vibrator transforms the energy provided by a diesel engine into a vibration. It is performed by a shaker, a movable element that generates the vibration thanks to a piston-reaction mass device driven by an electrohydraulic servo valve. The shaker is applied to the ground for each vibration, then raised up so that the seismic vibrator can move to another vibrating point.

Vibrator capability is defined by the maximum force it is capable to generate, called High Peak Force and measured in pound-force. To transmit a maximum force to the ground and prevent the shaker from bumping, part of the weight of the vibrator is applied to the shaker.

The vibration frequency typically ranges between 20–150 Hz.

== Popular culture ==
The plot of Ken Follett's 1998 thriller The Hammer of Eden turns on the use of a stolen seismic vibrator truck by ecoterrorists.
