= Oakley THUMP =

2004 sunglasses

- Manufacturer: Oakley, Inc.
- Type: Digital audio player/Sunglasses
- Lifespan: 11/1/04 - Present (new generation)
- Storage: 256 MB / 512 MB / 1 GB
- Input: 5 button
- Connectivity: USB 2.0
- Power: Lithium-ion battery

The Oakley THUMP were sunglasses that contained an MP3 player. Introduced in 2004, prices initially started at $249.

== Oakley THUMP ==
The Oakley THUMP were sunglasses that featured an audio player built into the frame, in addition to having the ability to flip up lenses for indoor usage. It was available in black, brown, tortoiseshell, and white. The user also had a choice between 128 megabytes or 256 megabytes of storage. To add music to the sunglasses, users would use programs such as MusicMatch or Windows Media Player, which is assisted with a USB interface. The THUMP was powered by a rechargeable lithium-ion battery.

== Oakley THUMP 2 ==
Oakley THUMP 2
- Manufacturer: Oakley, Inc.
- Type: Digital audio player/Sunglasses
- Lifespan: 11/1/04 - Present (new generation)
- Input: 5 button
- Connectivity: USB 2.0
- Power: Lithium-ion battery

The Oakley Thump 2 offers UV and blue-light protection. The Thump 2 incorporates a flash-based player into the frame of a pair of sunglasses for cordless on-the-go listening. Picking up where the original THUMP left off, quadrupling the memory for the same price as the original, 1GB for $299. The Thump 2 also comes in other sizes: 256MB, available in brown with bronze and gunmetal, as well as black with grey and gunmetal; and 512MB, presented in black with black iridium and chrome, in addition to white with black iridium and chrome. The Thump 2 earbuds use a multi-hinged system.

It comes with no proprietary software. To transfer the file to the Thump, the user plugs it into a Windows or Mac OS computer with the included USB 2.0 cord to upload AAC, MP3, WMA, or WAV tracks. It works with WMA DRM content but not AAC DRM (songs from the iTunes Music Store). Songs can be added to folders or as one long list. The Thump will sort correctly tagged songs by the artist during playback. The Thump remembers your progress when listening and doesn't start each new session at the beginning of the song list.
