= Clean-in-place =

Method of cleaning equipment without major disassembly

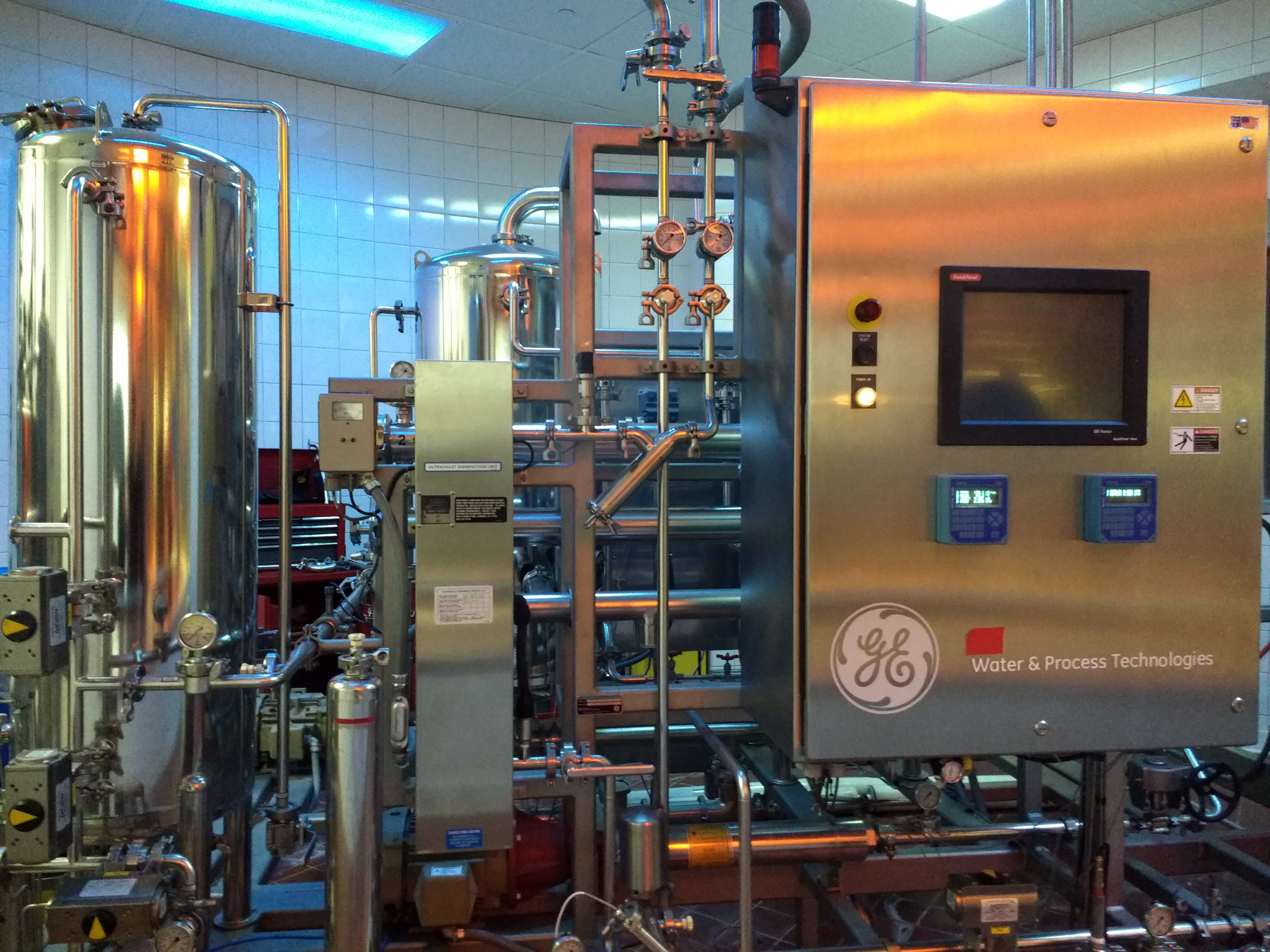
A clean-in-place unit on display at the World of Coca-Cola in Atlanta

Clean-in-place (CIP) is an automated method of cleaning the interior surfaces of pipes, vessels, equipment, filters and associated fittings, without major disassembly. CIP is commonly used for equipment such as piping, tanks, and filters. CIP employs turbulent flow through piping, and/or spray balls for tanks or vessels. In some cases, CIP can also be accomplished with fill, soak and agitate.

Up to the 1950s, closed systems were disassembled and cleaned manually. The advent of CIP was a boon to industries that needed frequent internal cleaning of their processes. Industries that rely heavily on CIP are those requiring high levels of hygiene, and include: dairy, beverage, brewing, processed foods, pharmaceutical, and cosmetics. A well designed CIP system is needed to accomplish required results from CIP.

The benefit to industries that use CIP is that the cleaning is faster, less labor-intensive and more repeatable, and poses less of a chemical exposure risk. CIP started as a manual practice involving a balance tank, centrifugal pump, and connection to the system being cleaned. Since the 1950s, CIP has evolved to include fully automated systems with programmable logic controllers, multiple balance tanks, sensors, valves, heat exchangers, data acquisition and specially designed spray nozzle systems. Simple, manually operated CIP systems can still be found in use today. However, fully automated CIP systems are in demand to avoid human errors, ensure consistent results, and minimize necessary resources.

Depending on soil load and process geometry, the CIP design principles are as follows:

- deliver highly turbulent, high flow-rate solution to effect sufficient cleaning (applies to pipe circuits and some filled equipment). The required flow rate can be calculated by considering fluid velocity minimum 1.5 m/s.
- deliver solution as a low-energy spray to fully wet the surface (applies to lightly soiled vessels where a static spray ball may be used).
- deliver a high energy impinging spray (applies to highly soiled or large diameter vessels where a dynamic spray device may be used).

== Factors affecting the effectiveness of the cleaning agents ==
Temperature of the cleaning solution. Elevating the temperature of a cleaning solution increases its dirt removal efficiency. Molecules with high kinetic energy dislodge dirt faster than the slow moving molecules of a cold solution.

Concentration of the cleaning agent. A concentrated cleaning solution will clean a dirty surface much better than a dilute one due to the increased surface binding capacity.

Contact time of the cleaning solution. The longer the detergent contact period, the higher the cleaning efficiency. After some time, the detergent eventually dissolves the hard stains/soil from the dirty surface.

Pressure exerted by the cleaning solution (or turbulence). The turbulence creates an abrasive force that dislodges stubborn soil from the dirty surface.

== Groundwater sources ==
Originally developed for cleaning closed systems as described above, CIP has more recently been applied to groundwater source boreholes used for high end-uses such as natural mineral/spring waters, food production and carbonated soft drinks (CSD).

Boreholes that are open to the atmosphere are prone to a number of chemical and microbiological problems, so sources for high end-use are often sealed at the surface (headworks). An air filter is built into the headworks to permit the borehole to inhale and exhale when the water level rises and falls quickly (usually due to the pump being turned on and off) without drawing in airborne particles or contaminants (spores, molds, fungi, bacteria, etc.).

In addition, CIP systems can be built into the borehole headworks to permit the injection of cleaning solutions (such as sodium hypochlorite or other sanitizers) and the subsequent recirculation of the mix of these chemicals and the groundwater. This process cleans the borehole interior and equipment without any invasive maintenance being required.

== Biomanufacturing Equipment ==
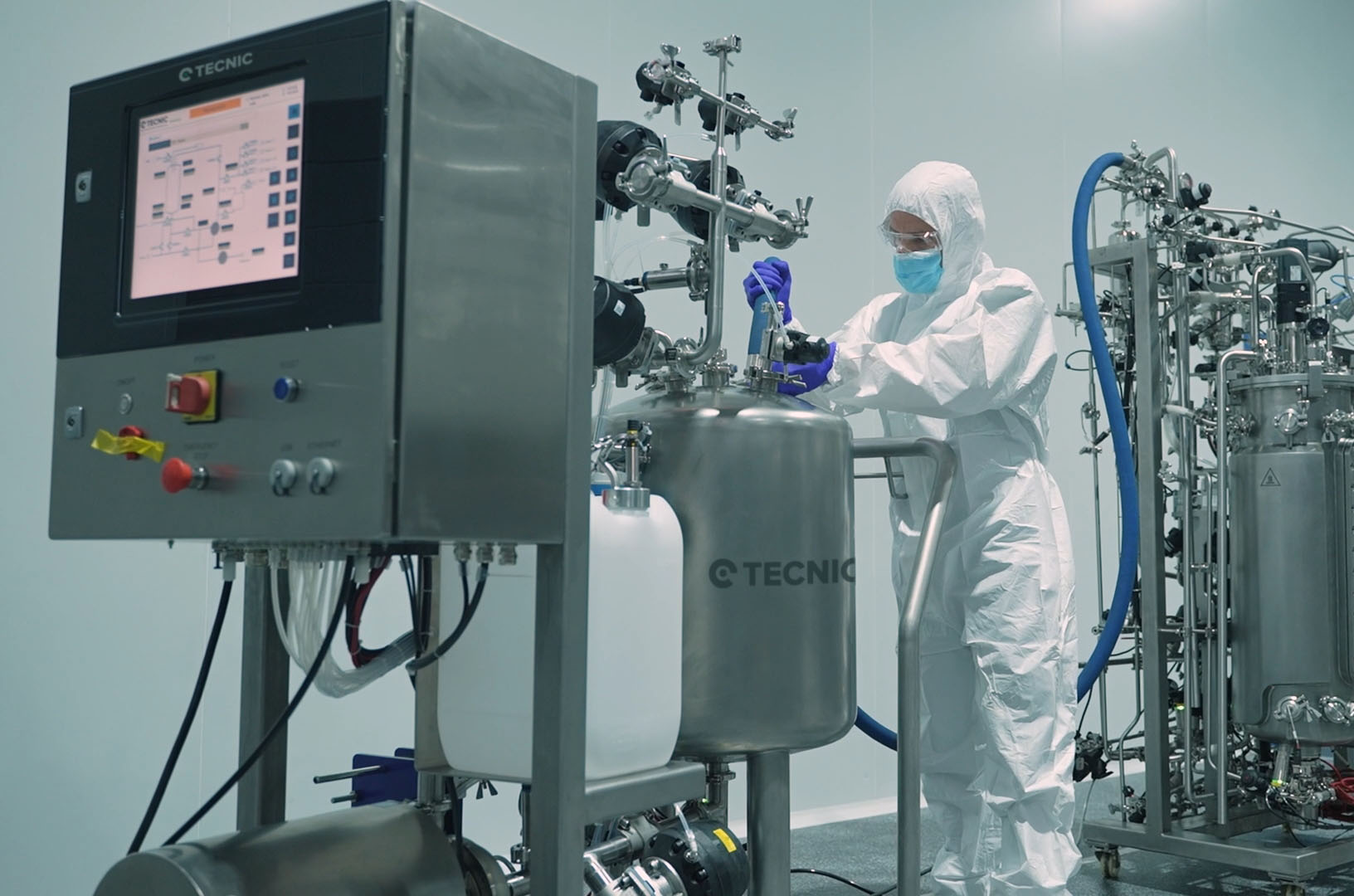
A person using a mobile CIP system to clean a bioreactor

CIP is commonly used for cleaning bioreactors, fermenters, mix vessels, and other equipment used in biotech manufacturing, pharmaceutical manufacturing and food and beverage manufacturing. CIP is performed to remove or obliterate previous mammalian cell culture batch components. It is used to remove in-process residues, control bioburden, and reduce endotoxin levels within processing equipment and systems. Residue removal is accomplished during CIP with a combination of heat, chemical action, and turbulent flow.

The U.S. Food and Drug Administration published a CIP regulation in 1978 applicable to pharmaceutical manufacturing. The regulation states, "Equipment and utensils shall be cleaned, maintained, and sanitized at appropriate intervals to prevent malfunctions or contamination that would alter the safety, identity, strength, quality or purity of the drug product beyond the official or other established requirements."

Repeatable, reliable, and effective cleaning is of the utmost importance in a manufacturing facility. Cleaning procedures are validated to demonstrate that they are effective, reproducible, and under control. In order to adequately clean processing equipment, the equipment must be designed with smooth stainless steel surfaces and interconnecting piping that has cleanable joints. The chemical properties of the cleaning agents must properly interact with the chemical and physical properties of the residues being removed.

A typical CIP cycle consists of many steps which often include (in order):

- Pre-rinse with WFI (water for injection) or PW (purified water) which is performed to wet the interior surface of the tank and remove residue. It also provides a non-chemical pressure test of the CIP flow path.
- Caustic solution single pass flush through the vessel to drain. Caustic is the main cleaning solution.
- Caustic solution re-circulation through the vessel.
- Intermediate WFI or PW rinse
- Acid solution wash – used to remove mineral precipitates and protein residues.
- Final rinse with WFI or PW – rinses to flush out residual cleaning agents.
- disinfectant solution wash or hot water circulation to kill all microbes.
- Final air blow – used to remove moisture remaining after CIP cycle.

Critical parameters must be met and remain within the specification for the duration of the cycle. If the specification is not reached or maintained, cleaning will not be ensured and will have to be repeated. Critical parameters include temperature, flow rate/supply pressure, chemical concentration, chemical contact time, and final rinse conductivity (which shows that all cleaning chemicals have been removed).

== Validation and Verification of CIP ==
Riboflavin testing is a commonly used method in clean-in-place (CIP) validation to verify the effectiveness of cleaning procedures in tanks, piping, and process equipment. The test involves applying a riboflavin solution to surfaces before a cleaning cycle. Since riboflavin is highly fluorescent under UV light, UV lamps can be used after the cleaning process to check for any residual traces, indicating areas that were not adequately cleaned.

This method is widely used in industries such as:

- Pharmaceutical manufacturing
- Food and beverage production
- Biotechnology and sterile processing

Riboflavin testing is valued for its cost-effectiveness, ease of use, and sensitivity, making it a practical tool for ensuring compliance with industry cleaning standards.

== See also ==
- Effluent guidelines (U.S. wastewater regulations)
- Effluent limitation
- Good manufacturing practice
- Ice pigging
- Riboflavin
- Washdown
- Wastewater
