= Hydraulically activated pipeline pigging =

Method of pressure driven pipeline cleaning

Hydraulically activated pipeline pigging (HAPP) is a pigging technology applied for pipeline cleaning. The basic principle is that a pressure drop is created over a by-passable pig held back against a pipeline's fluid flow. The pipeline fluid passing through the pig's cleaning head is accelerated by this pressure drop, forming strong cleaning jets. These jets are directed onto the inner wall in front of the pig, removing all kinds of deposits.

== Introduction to pipeline pigging ==
Pipeline pigs are devices that are inserted into and travel throughout the length of a pipeline driven by the product flow. They were originally developed to remove deposits which could obstruct or retard flow through a pipeline (Fig. 1). Today pigs are used during all phases in the life of a pipeline for many different reasons.

Fig. 1 Cleaning pig in a pipeline

Fig. 2 Classification of pipeline pigs

Pigs used today can be divided into three categories (Fig. 2):

- Utility Pigs, are used to perform functions such as cleaning, separating, or dewatering.
- In Line Inspection (ILI) Tools, provide information on the condition of the line, as well as the extent and location of any problems.
- Gel Pigs, are used in conjunction with conventional pigs to optimize pipeline dewatering, cleaning, and drying tasks.

Generally for cleaning pigs, the cleaning force applied is the mechanical force between the pipe inner wall and the cleaning pig itself. This force is determined by the pig travel speed as well as by the hardness and shape of the cleaning edge: The faster the pig, the higher the cleaning impact on the deposits, but at the same time only the surface of the debris is scratched away. Therefore, several, sometimes many, pig runs are required to clean a pipeline.

Hydraulically activated pigs apply high pressure liquid jets either supplied by high pressure hoses (depended) or made available by the kinetic energy locally available. Depended hydraulically activated pigs are limited in reach due to the hose which needs to be inserted into the pipeline and guides the cleaning head.

== HAPP principle ==
Fig. 3 Components of a hydraulically activated power pig

A hydraulically activated pig consists of three units (Fig. 3): a brake unit, a seal unit and the cleaning head.

All units have openings that allow the entire fluid flow through the pipeline to bypass. The brake unit ensures that a hydraulically activated pig is held back against the fluid flow in the pipeline. The fluid pushes against the following seal unit, which channels it into the openings of the cleaning head. The seal unit and cleaning head restrict the flow, resulting in a pressure difference across the pig. Thus, the fluid is accelerated in the cleaning head's nozzles, creating extremely powerful liquid jets. These jets are directed onto the pipe inner wall to remove any kind of deposits.

The brake unit ensures that the travel speed of the pig is much slower than the fluid velocity, thus allowing it to entirely remove deposits from the pipe wall before it travels across the cleaned surface. The deposits removed are immediately flushed down the pipeline with the main jet of the cleaning head which is directed to the middle of the pipeline. With all deposits removed from the pipe wall and transported downstream by the fluid flow there remains no risk of the pig getting stuck in debris accumulated in front of it.
