= Washdown =

Cleaning or washing a surface for appearance, sanitation, or removal of contamination

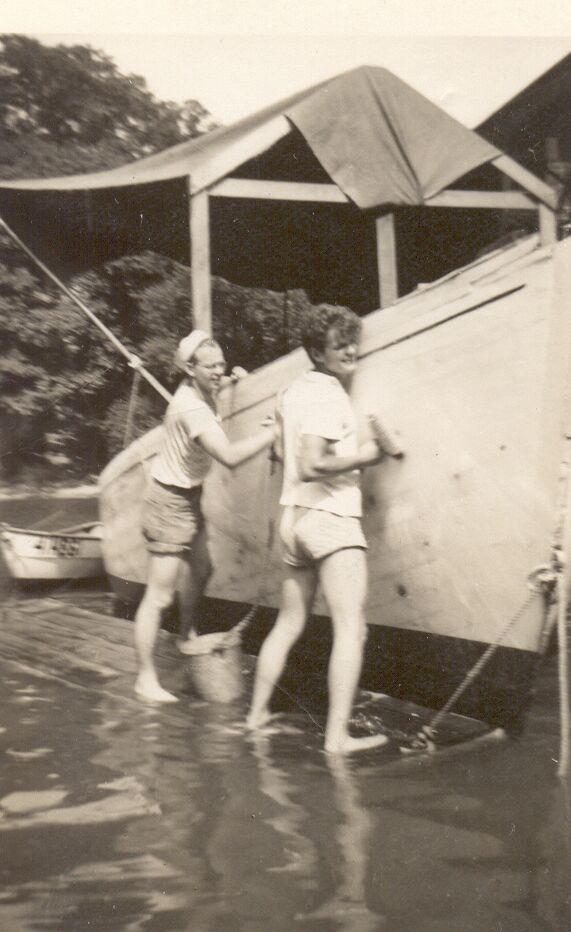
Washing down the hull of a rowboat, 1940

Washdown (also wash down) is the process of cleaning or washing a surface for appearance, sanitation, or removal of contamination. It may involve pressure washing. Sometimes wash down involves rinsing with fresh water; other times it involves use of detergents and other chemicals.

== Food processing and packaging machinery ==
Regulations for processing sensitive products such as food and pharmaceuticals require periodic thorough washing and sanitizing. Some equipment can be moved to a central washing facility. Other machinery must be cleaned in place using portable specialized washing equipment. High-pressure cleaning is used with water and cleaning chemicals. A washdown is usually a manual operation and is designed to kill bacteria and other microorganisms. Automatic cleaning of industrial equipment is often carried out by clean-in-place (CIP) and/or steam-in-place (SIP) operations. CIP (CIP) systems often make use of programmable logic controllers and SCADA software.

== Decks and driveways ==
Washdown is the process of using a stream of water to clean a flat or nearly flat outdoor surface. Typically the area cleaned is a large expanse of concrete or asphalt. The area is cleaned of dirt and debris with the force and dissolving power of stream of water projected from a hose. Generally, one person holds and aims the hose, though if the hose is longer than 300 feet then another person may be required to help move the hose itself. Water is typically squirted from the hose at a pressure of 300 psi. The hose itself can vary in length from 75 to 425 feet. Typically the hose when used by a single person is 300 feet long. The hose itself carries water from a water main which attaches to the hose through what is called a “stinger“. The stinger screws into the water main pipe and is held there.

Also, the stinger as it is pushed down into the water supply pipe opens a seal which releases the water into the hose. At the other end of the hose a nozzle regulates the flow of water and allows for a large fanned-out spray, as well as a more concentrated stream termed a needlepoint.

== Contamination ==
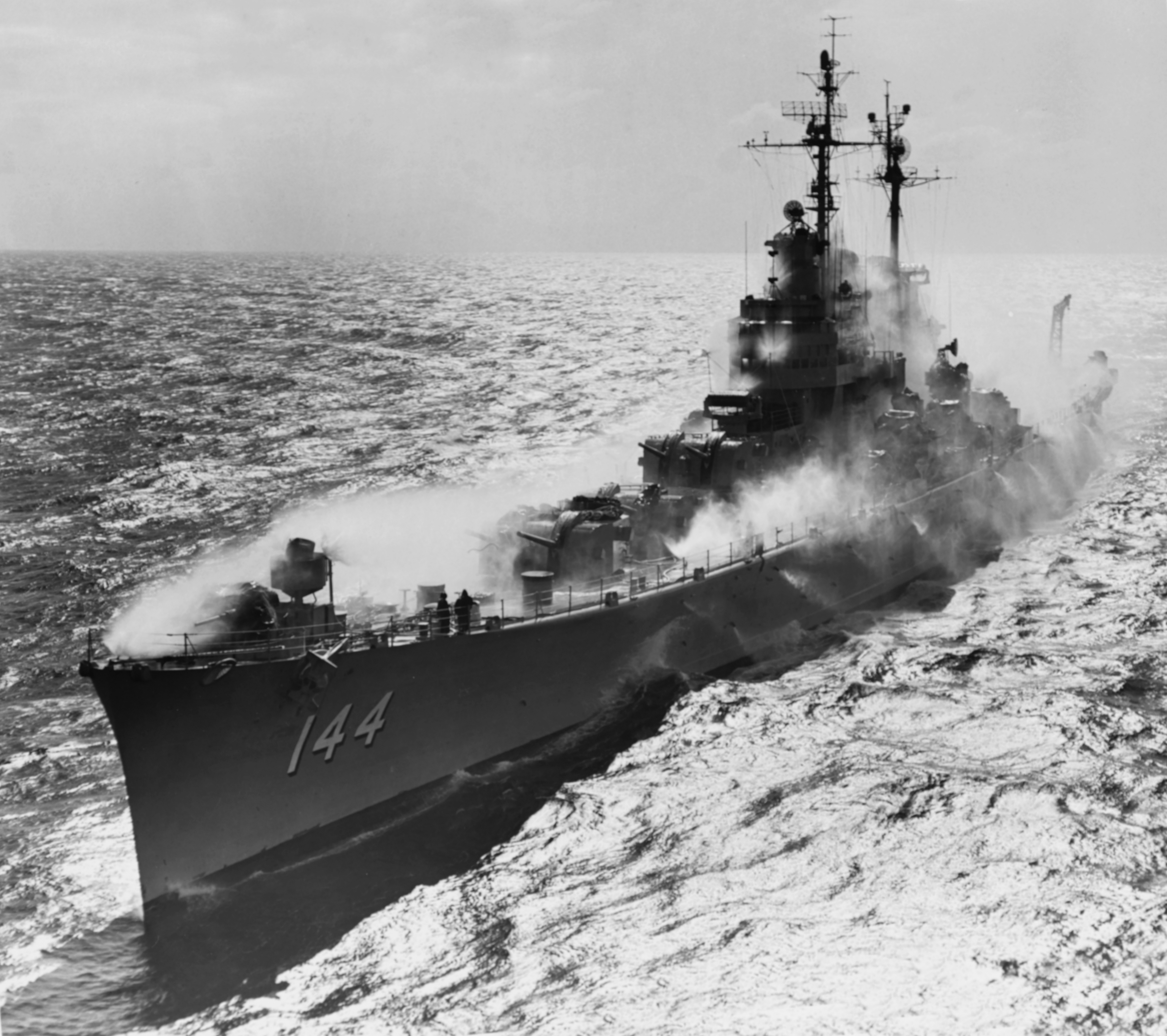
Naval ship having a nuclear contamination wash down exercise, 1954

Military and civil defense have exercises to remove chemical and radioactive contamination from vehicles, buildings, people, etc.

== See also ==
- Good manufacturing practice
- Hazard analysis and critical control points
- Clean-in-place
