= Pipeline video inspection =

Pipeline video inspection is a form of telepresence used to visually inspect the interiors of pipelines, plumbing systems, and storm drains. A common application is for a plumber to determine the condition of small diameter sewer lines and household connection drain pipes.

Older sewer lines of small diameter, typically 6-inch (150 mm), are made by the union of a number of short 3 feet (0.91 m) sections. The pipe segments may be made of cast iron, with 12 feet (3.7 m) to 20 feet (6.1 m) sections, but are more often made of vitrified clay pipe (VCP), a ceramic material, in 3 feet (0.91 m), 4 feet (1.2 m) & 6 feet (1.8 m) sections. Each iron or clay segment will have an enlargement (a "bell") on one end to receive the end of the adjacent segment. Roots from trees and vegetation may work into the joins between segments and can be forceful enough to break open a larger opening in terra cotta or corroded cast iron. Eventually a root ball will form that will impede the flow and this may cleaned out by a cutter mechanism or plumber's snake and subsequently inhibited by use of a chemical foam - a rooticide.

With modern video equipment, the interior of the pipe may be inspected - this is a form of non-destructive testing. A small diameter collector pipe will typically have a cleanout access at the far end and will be several hundred feet long, terminating at a manhole. Additional collector pipes may discharge at this manhole and a pipe (perhaps of larger diameter) will carry the effluent to the next manhole, and so forth to a pump station or treatment plant.

Without regular inspection of public sewers, a significant amount of waste may accumulate unnoticed until the system fails. In order to prevent resulting catastrophic events such as pipe bursts and raw sewage flooding onto city streets, municipalities usually conduct pipeline video inspections as a precautionary measure.

The cameras are advanced diagnostic tools that allow plumbers to execute plumbing inspections, called CCTV Drain Surveys with heightened accuracy.

== Purpose ==
CCTV drain cameras are used to uncover any damages or obstructions within the plumbing system. They provide a non-invasive and efficient way to assess the internal condition of drainage pipes and sewer systems, ensuring that issues are accurately identified and addressed without the need for disruptive excavation or guesswork.

These advanced cameras are equipped with high-resolution imaging and flexible cables that allow them to navigate through various pipe sizes and shapes, capturing clear, real-time footage of the inside of the drainage network. As modern-day technology, they are specifically designed for surveying and assessing the working condition of water pipes and sewer lines, making them an invaluable tool for both residential and commercial applications.

In the plumbing world, CCTV drain cameras are commonly used to detect and locate potential problems, such as debris buildups, collapsed pipe sections, root infestations, and pipe offsets. By providing a clear visual of the interior of the drainage system, these cameras help professionals diagnose issues accurately and plan effective solutions. This level of precision eliminates the need for trial-and-error methods, reducing repair time and cost for property owners.

Moreover, CCTV inspections are often conducted as part of routine maintenance to prevent serious drainage problems from developing. Early identification of minor defects, such as hairline cracks or corrosion, allows plumbers to recommend proactive repairs, extending the lifespan of the drainage system. Consequently, CCTV drain cameras contribute significantly to maintaining the overall health and functionality of plumbing networks.

== Inspection equipment ==
Truck with fish, winch and cable, video pig, and downhole cable turn

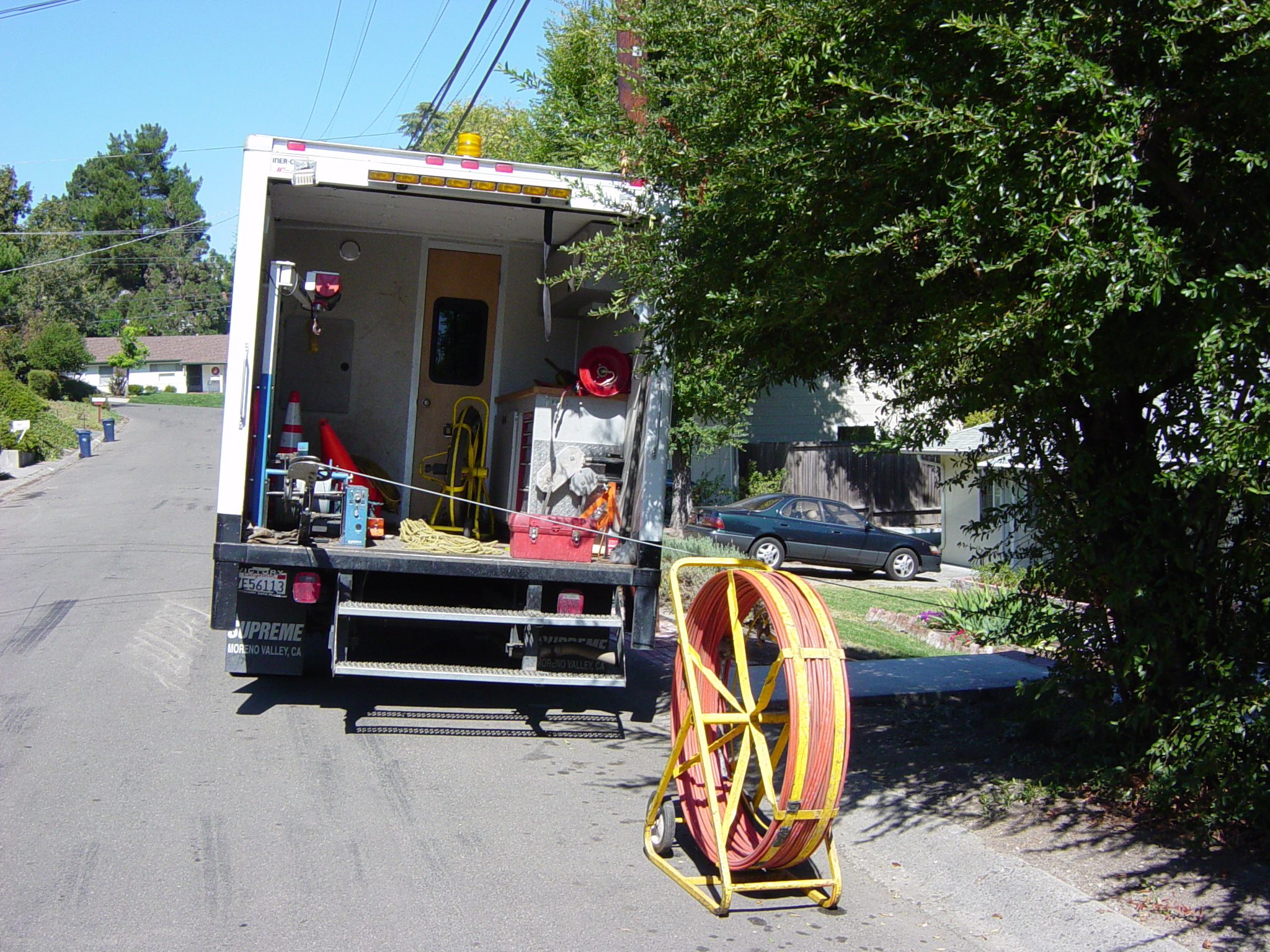

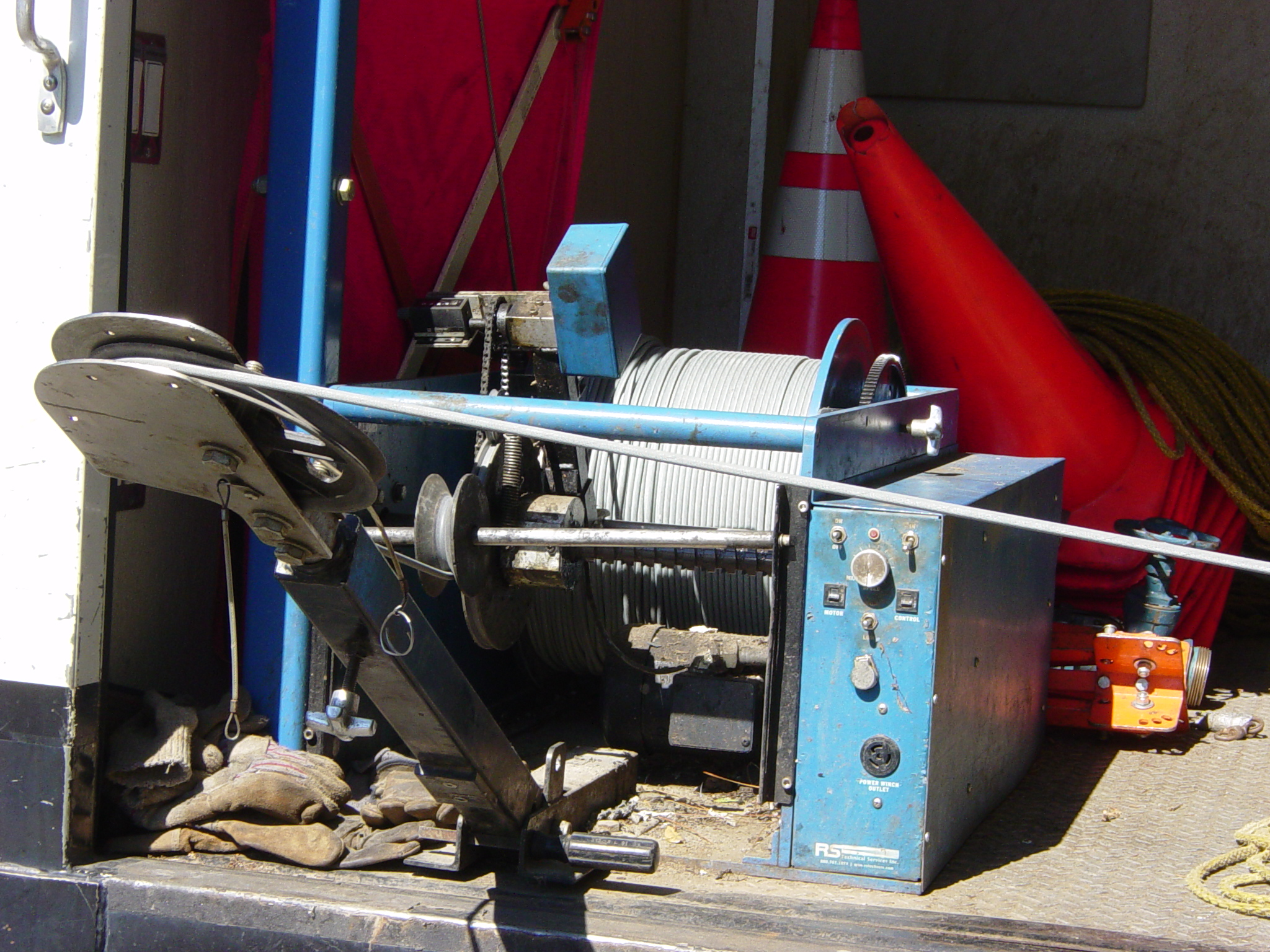

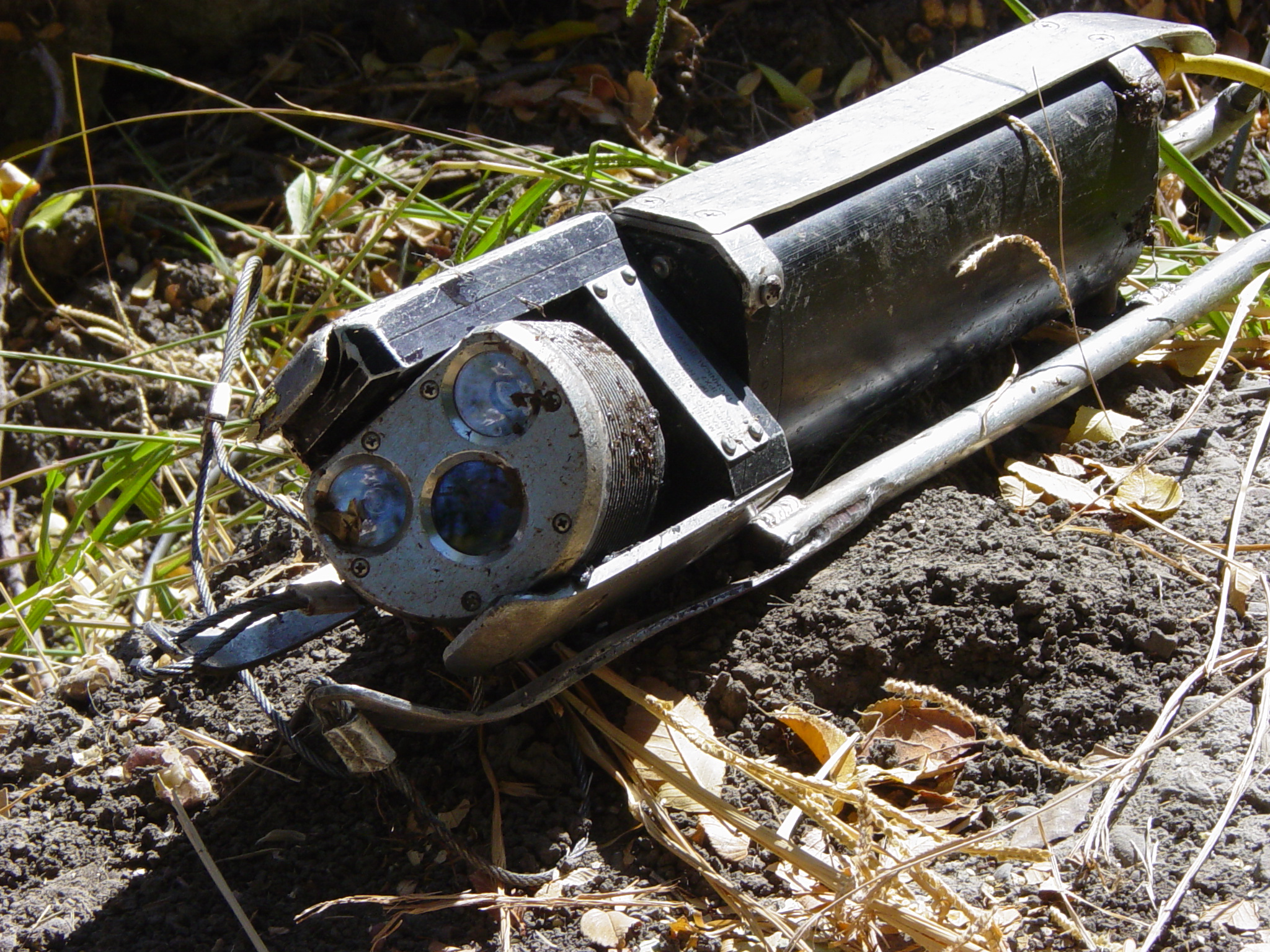

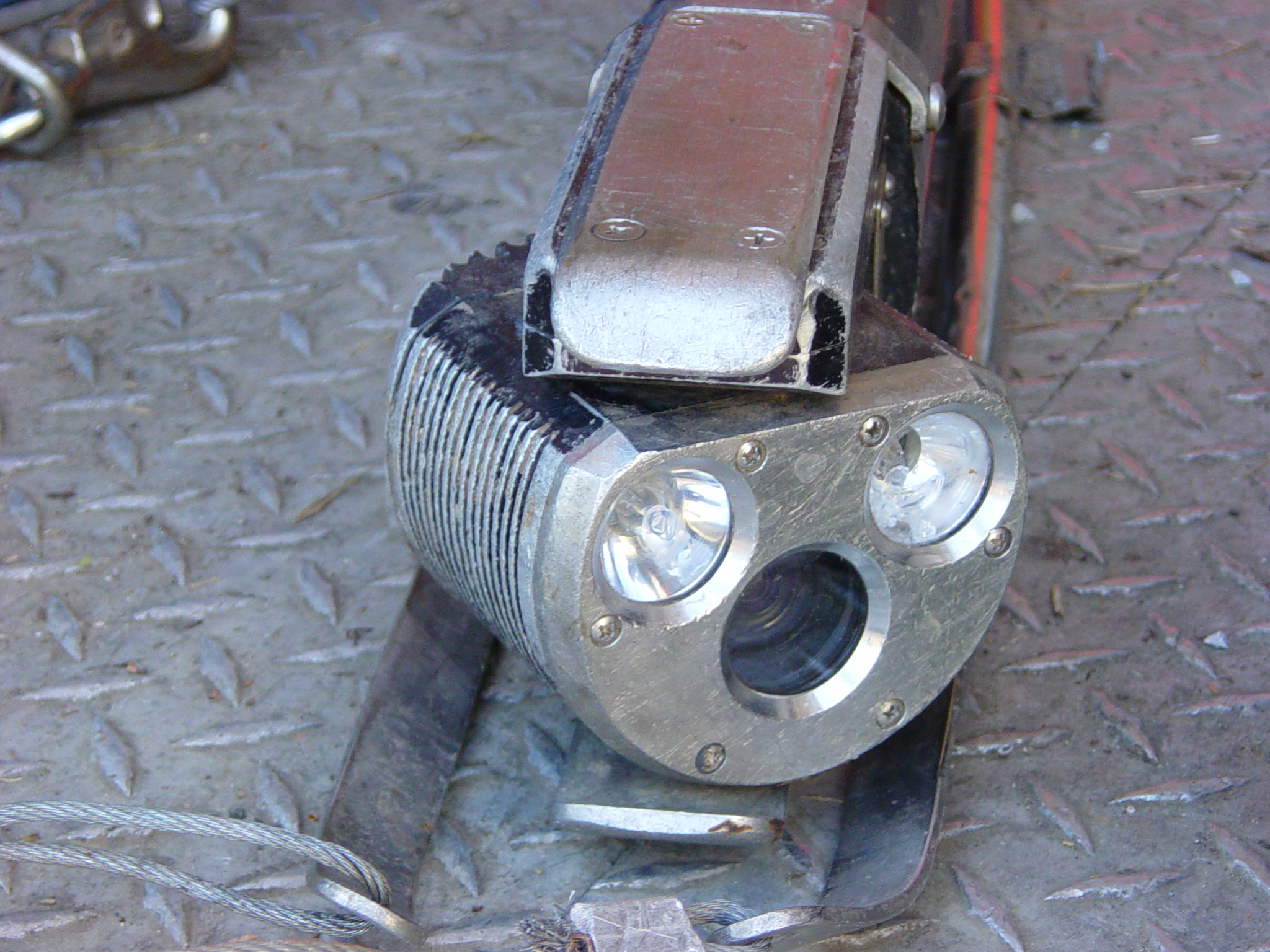
Swiveling head detail

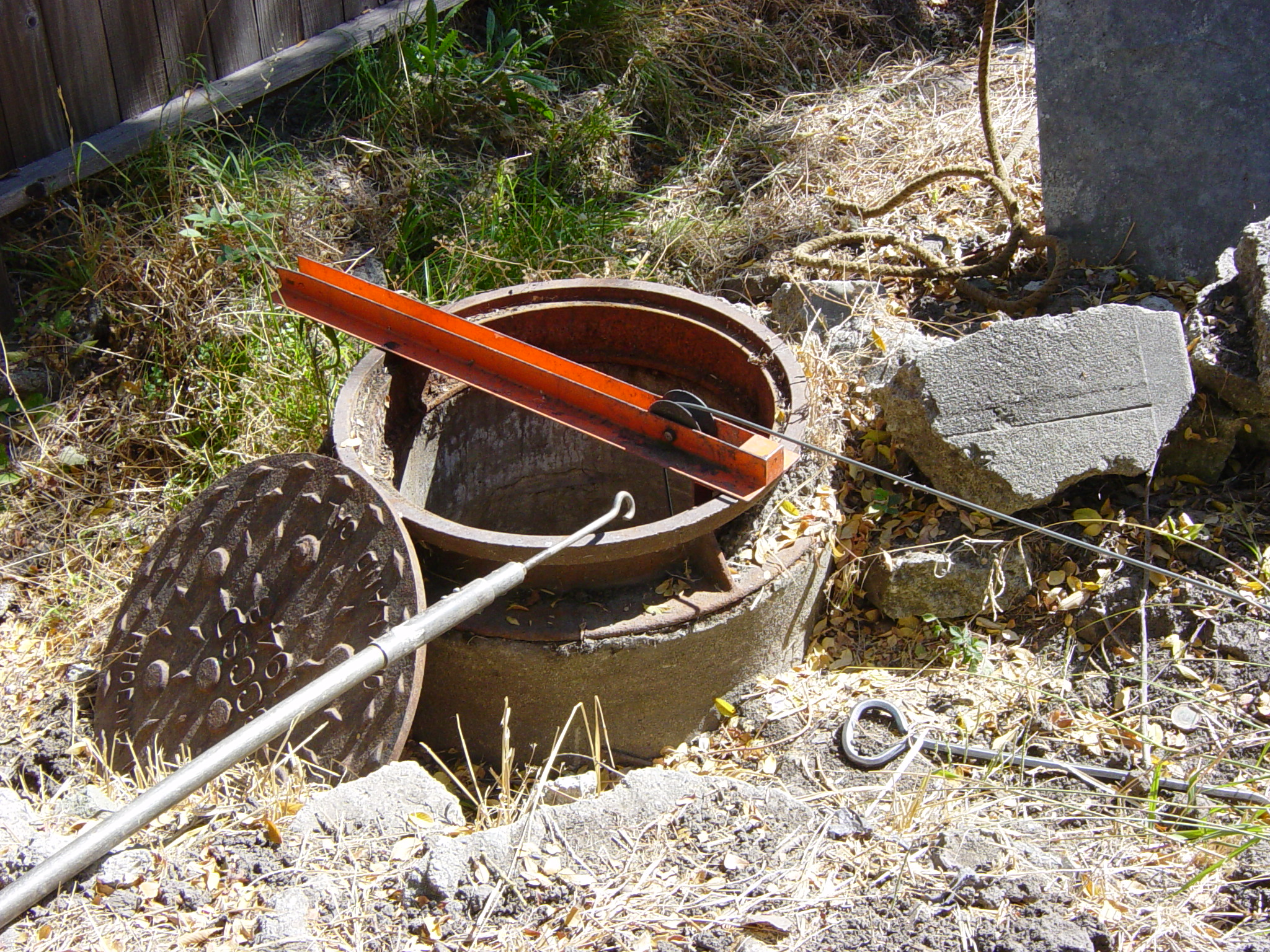

Cameras can vary; the main difference being the size of the pipe the camera ca inspect. The total distance they can travel within the pipeline is also a common difference between models.

=== Service truck ===
The service truck contains a power supply in the form of a small generator, a small air-conditioned compartment containing video monitoring and recording equipment, and related computer and display for feature recording.

=== Cable and winch ===
At the back end of the truck is a powered reel with video cable reinforced with kevlar or steel wire braid. Some trucks also contain a powered winch that booms out from the truck allowing for lowering and retrieval of the inspection equipment from the pipeline.

=== Inspection camera ===
Sometimes referred to as a PIG (pipeline inspection gauge), the camera and lights are mounted in a swivelling head attached to a cylindrical body. The camera head can pan and tilt remotely. Integrated into the camera head are lighting devices, typically LEDs, for illuminating the pipeline. The camera is connected to display equipment via a long cable wound upon a winch. Some companies, such as Rausch Electronics USA, incorporate a series of lasers in the camera to accurately measure the pipe diameter and other data.

== Inspection process ==
=== Using a camera tractor ===
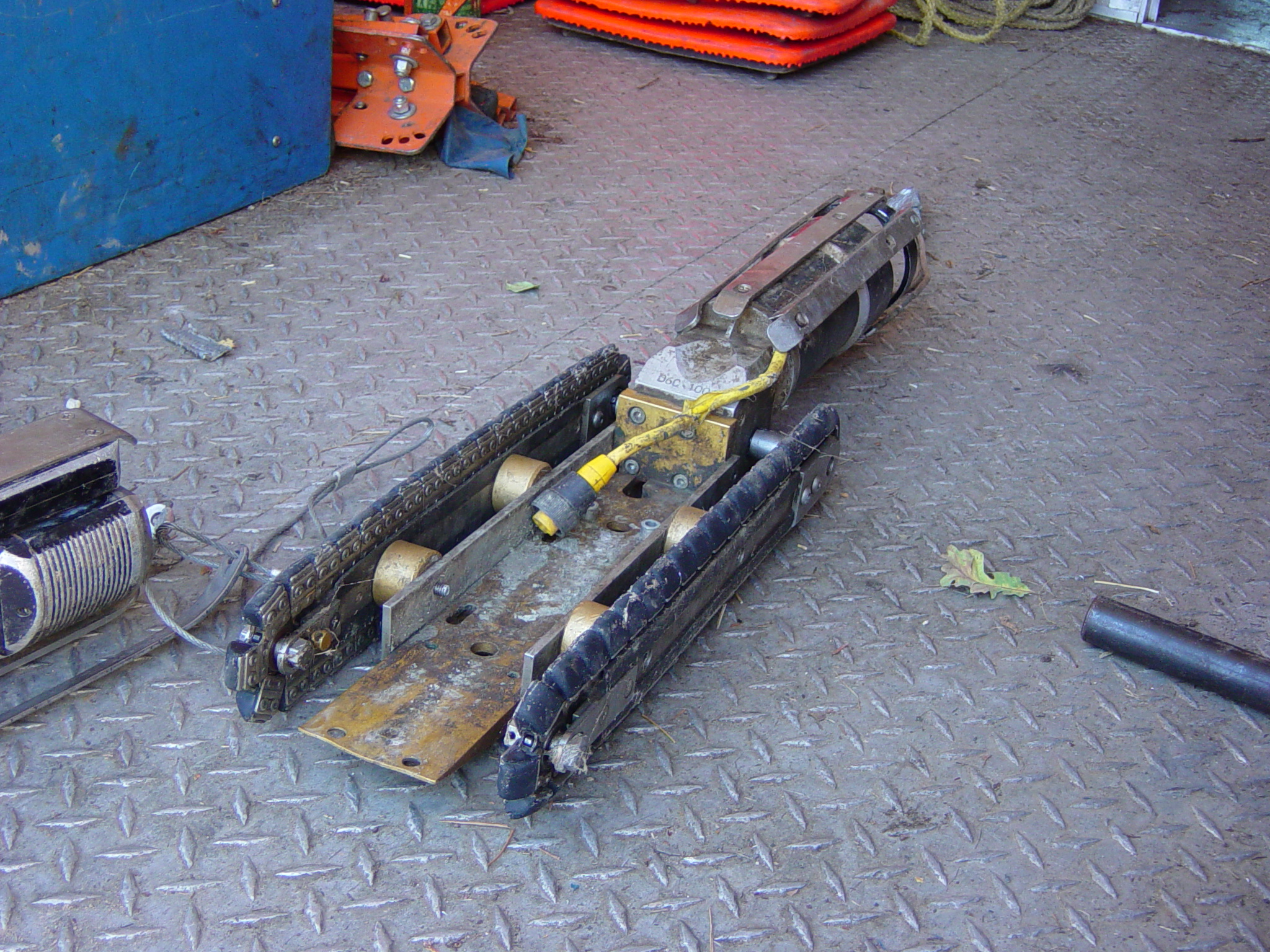
Tractor with motor and cradle for the inspection head

A run to be inspected will either start from an access pipe leading at an angle down to the sewer and then run downstream to a manhole, or will run between manholes. The service truck is parked above the access point of the pipe. The camera tractor, with a flexible cable attached to the rear, is then lowered into the pipeline. The tractor is moved forward so that it is barely inside of the pipeline. A "down-hole roller" is set up between the camera tractor and the cable reel in the service truck, preventing cable damage from rubbing the top of the pipeline. The operator then retires to the inside of the truck and begins the inspection, remotely operating the camera tractor from the truck. When the inspection is complete or the camera cable is fully extended, the camera tractor is put in reverse gear and the cable is wound up simultaneously. When the camera tractor is near the original access point, the downhole roller is pulled up and the camera tractor is moved into the access point and pulled up to the service truck. A tractor may be used to inspect a complete blockage or collapse that would prevent using a fish and rope as described below.

=== Pulling the camera backwards ===
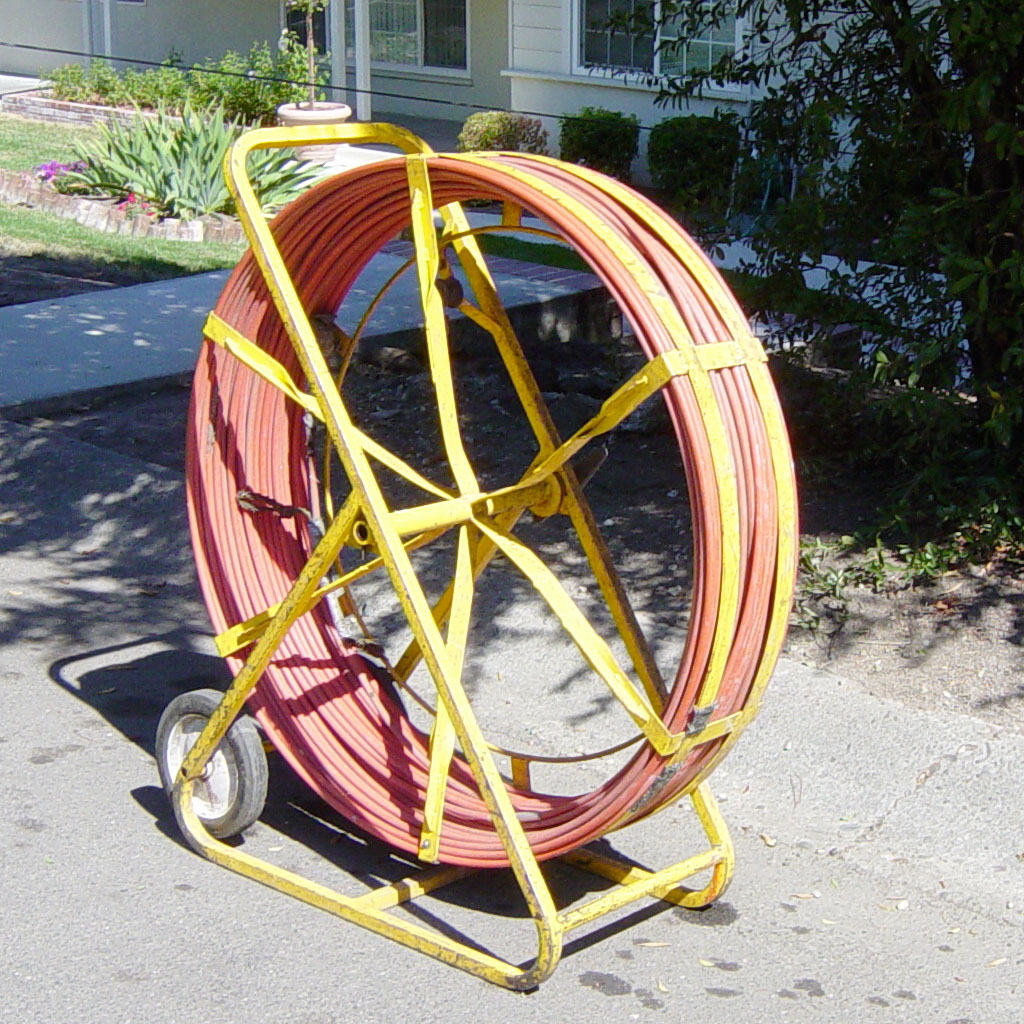
Semi-rigid fish may be pushed through the pipe to fetch a rope

For small diameter pipes there may not be enough room for the tractor mechanism. Instead, a somewhat rigid "fish" is pushed through the pipe and attached to a rope at the access point near the truck. The fish is then pulled to place the rope along the pipe. The rope is then used to pull the inspection pig and cable through the pipe. Detaching the rope, the cable is then used to pull the pig backwards as the pipe is inspected on the monitor (this is the method shown in the illustrations below).

== Analysis of video footage ==
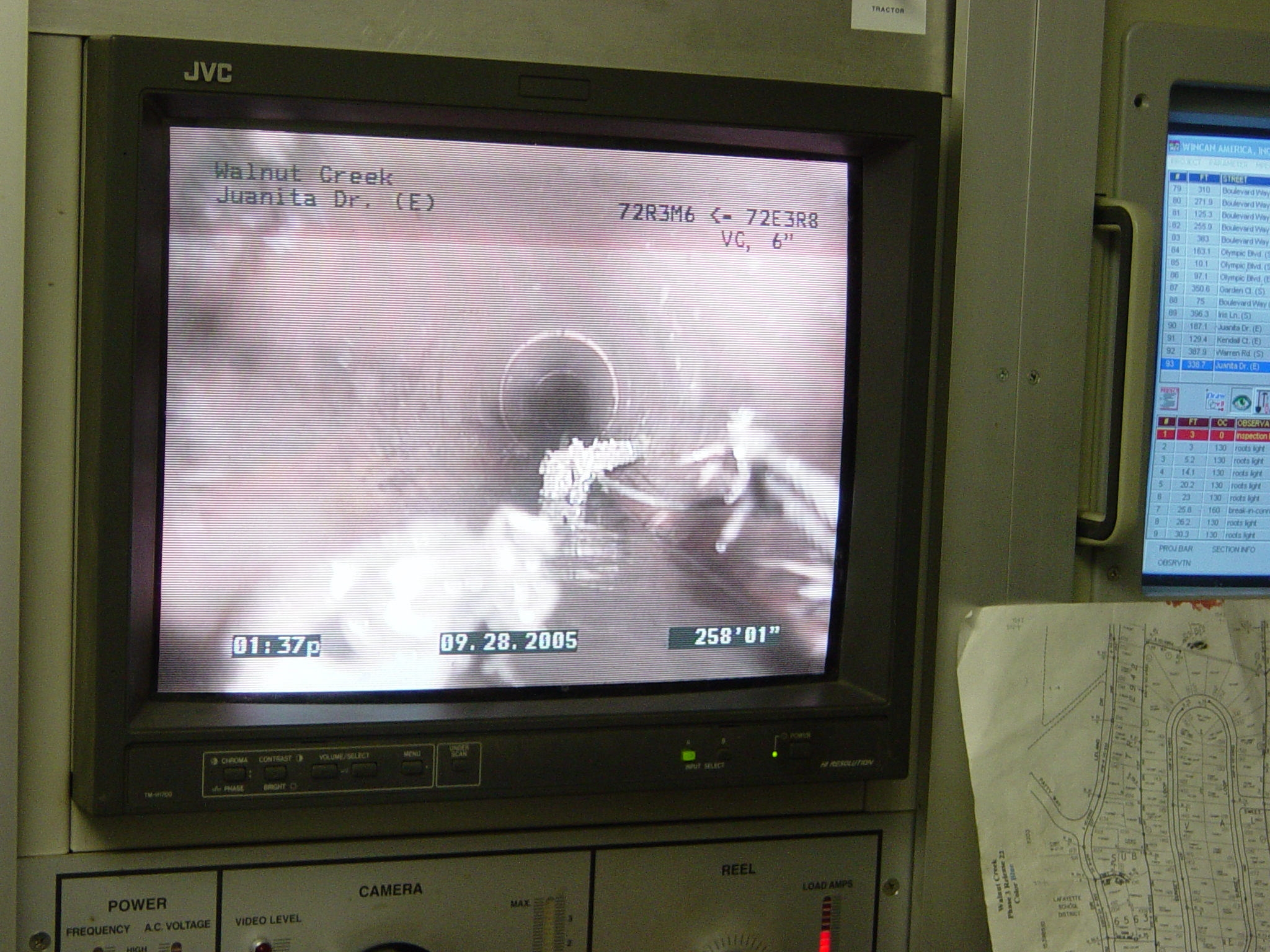
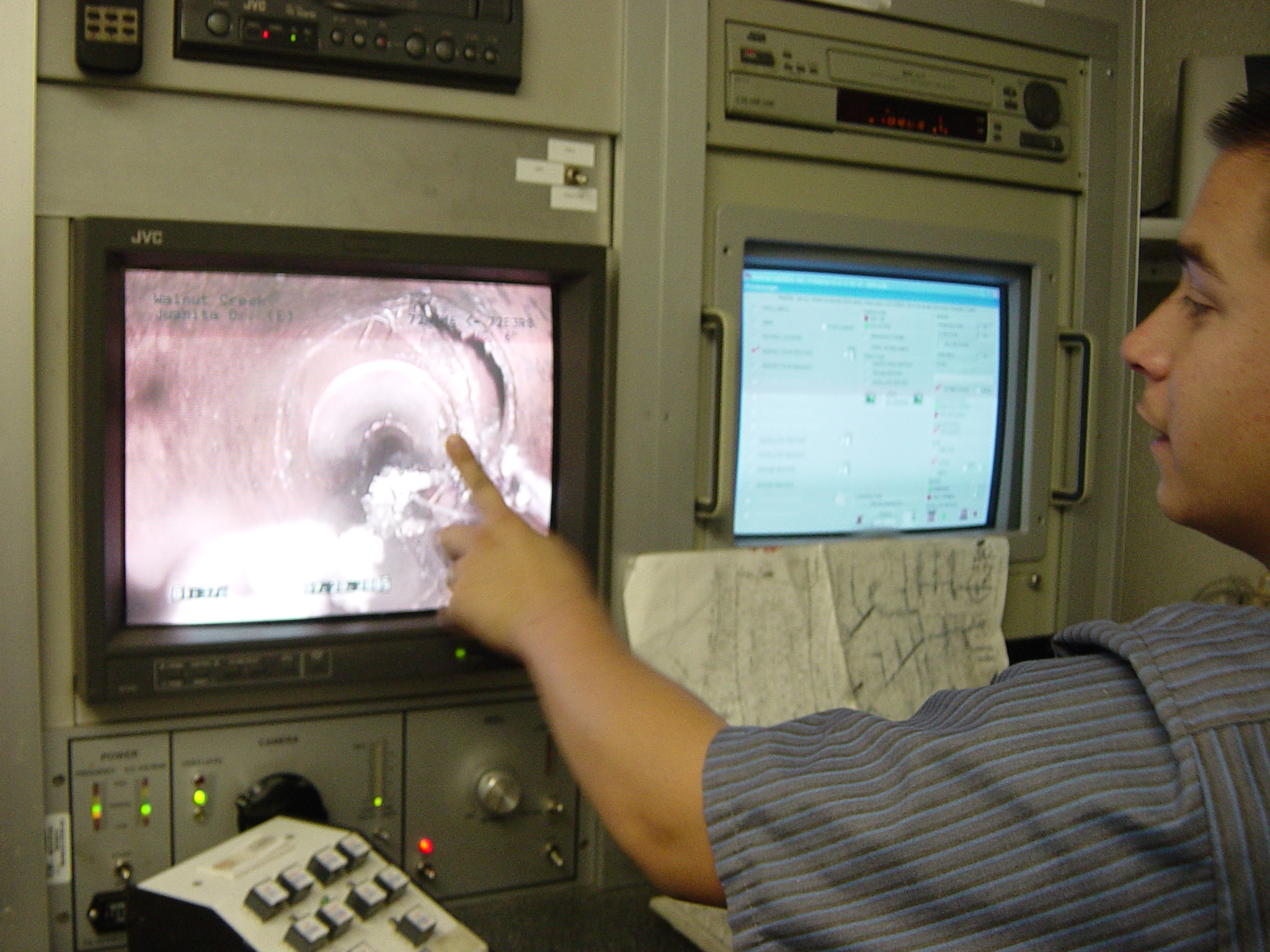
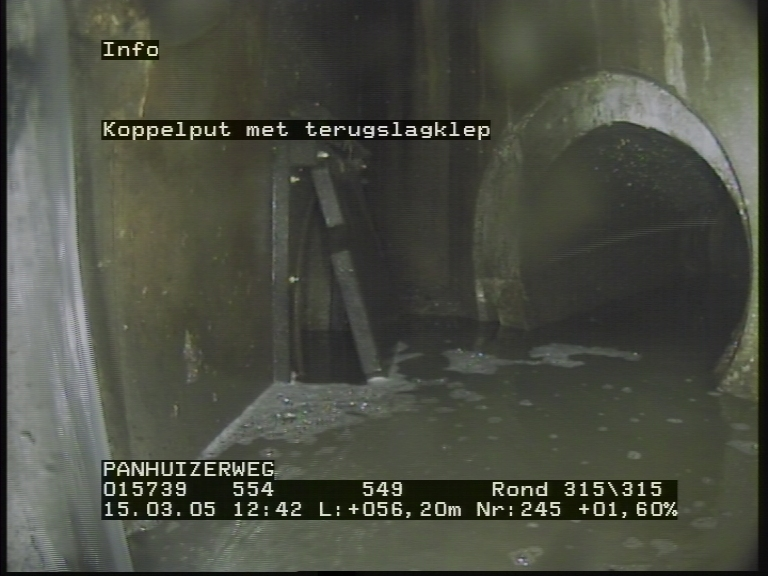

Much of the analysis of what was viewed in the pipeline is conducted at the time of the inspection by the camera operator, but the entire inspection is always recorded and saved for review. Commercial software and hardware for video pipe inspection are available from a variety of vendors, including Wincan, ITpipes, and Cues.

== Conduit rehabilitation ==
Depending mostly upon the change in conditions from a previous inspection various improvements may be made to the pipe. It may be cleaned with a rotating root cutting blade on the end of a segmented rotating chain, or a chemical foam may be applied to discourage root growth. If damage is found limited to only a few locations these may be excavated and repaired. Extensive moderate defects may be repaired by lining with a fabric liner that is pulled through the pipe, inflated, and then made rigid through chemical means. Severe damage may require excavation and replacement of the conduit.
