= Ice pigging =

Pipe cleaning method

Ice pigging is a process in which an ice slurry is pumped through a pipe, forcefully removing unwanted deposits and leaving the pipe clean. It has many applications in the water, sewage, and food industries.

== Process ==
Ice pigging is a technique used for cleaning pipes, distinguished from traditional pigging by the use of a semi-solid 'pig' made of ice, rather than a solid object. This ice pig is capable of flowing through pipes, navigating obstructions such as valves and variations in pipe diameter, due to its fluid-like properties. The process allows for the insertion and ejection of the ice pig using fittings of small diameter, enhancing its adaptability to various piping systems.

The process can be undertaken with pipes made of most common pipe materials, and on pipes with diameters ranging from 8 mm to 600 mm and lengths of several kilometers. The ice pigging process takes less time than traditional pigging methods for underground pipes and can be operated by fewer people.

Minimal work is required to insert the ice pig and remove it. By doing this, the disruption of water supply is decreased.

Any water flushing method (such as uni-directional flushing, air/water flushing, or closed loop with side stream filtration) is limited by the flow of liquid through the pipework due to a boundary layer of slower flow that occurs at the pipe surface. As a result of this boundary layer the wall shear generated is negligible, even at high flow rates. Because the ice pig moves through the pipework like a solid object, movement concentrates at the pipe wall resulting in high wall shear even at velocities as low as 0.2 m/sec.

The process provides a low risk solution to cleaning a pipe compared to traditional pigging as, in the unlikely scenario of the ice becoming stuck, it can be left to melt and then flushed out.

== Environmental impacts ==
Ice pigging uses less water and requires less cleanup than traditional flushing or underground pipe pigging techniques. The production of ice slurry demands a substantial amount of energy.

== Research and development ==
The University of Bristol has produced a paper entitled "Investigation and development of an innovative pigging technique for the water supply industry." in which they have detailed the research that they have carried out. It looks particularly at how the properties of the ice pig behave with different ice fractions and varied levels of particulate loading as well as looking into the effects of shear strength, viscosity, and heat transfer characteristics.
