= UGW (disambiguation) =

United Garment Workers of America is a labor union.

UGW or Ugw may also refer to:

- Ultrasonic guided waves, a form of guided wave testing
- Unconfined ground water, in agricultural hydrology
