= Magnetic particle inspection =

Non-destructive method used to detect defects in ferrous materials

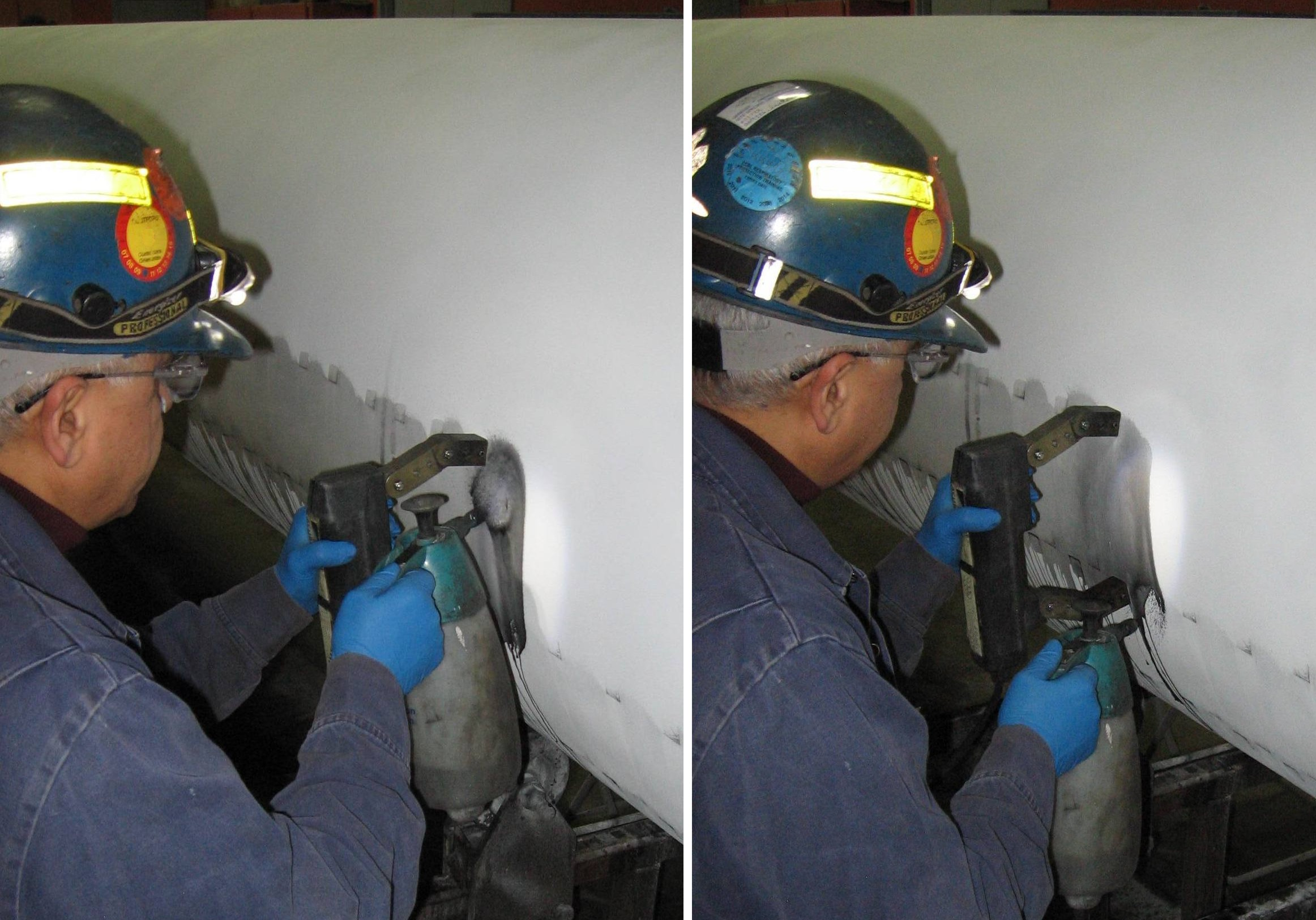
A technician performs MPI on a pipeline to check for stress corrosion cracking using what is known as the "black on white" method. No indications of cracking appear in this picture; the only marks are the "footprints" of the magnetic yoke and drip marks.

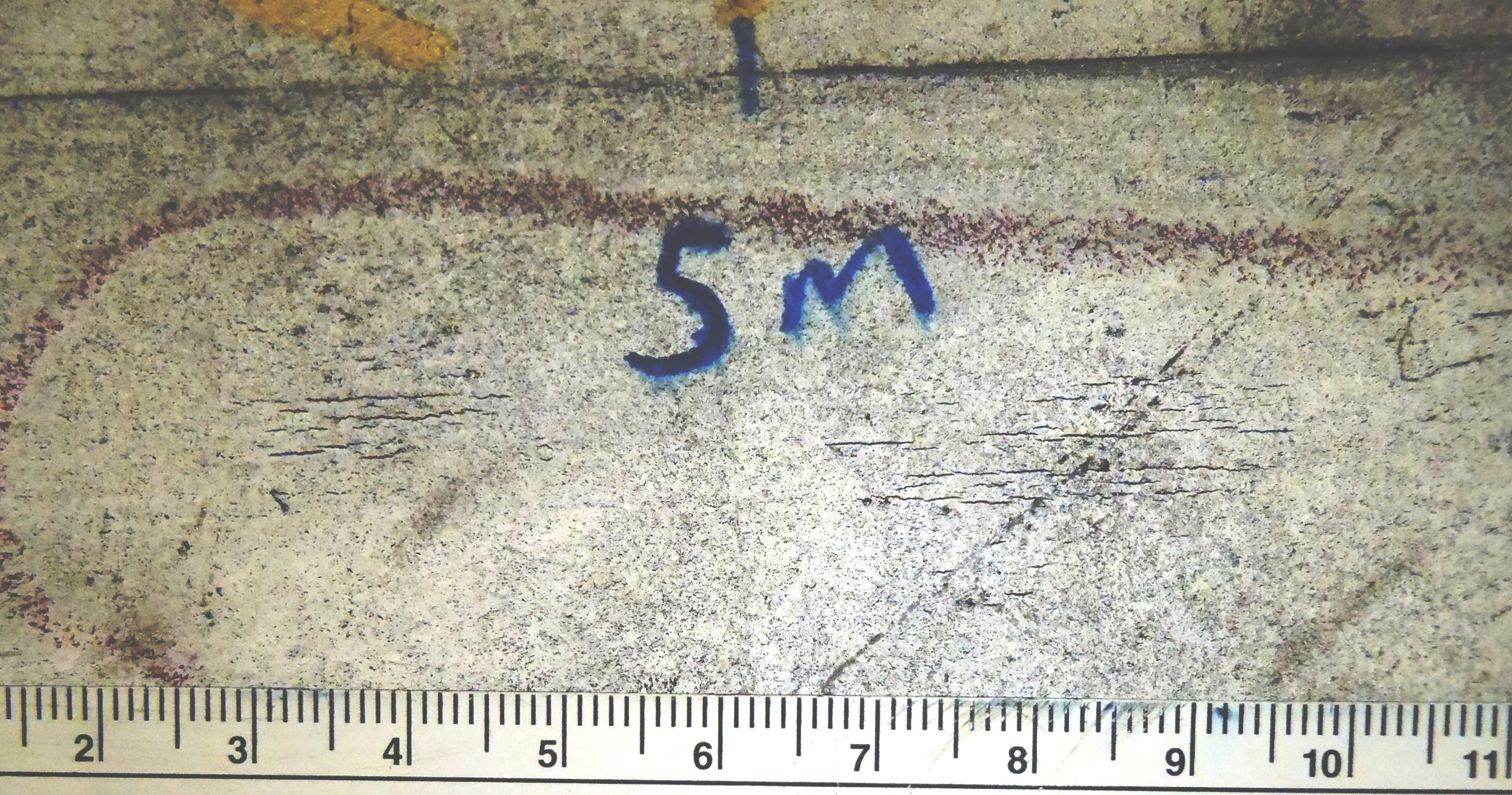
A close-up of the surface of a (different) pipeline showing indications of stress corrosion cracking (two clusters of small black lines) revealed by MPI. Cracks that would normally have been invisible are detectable due to the magnetic particles clustering at the crack openings. The scale at the bottom is numbered in centimeters.

Magnetic particle inspection (MPI) is a nondestructive testing process where a magnetic field is used for detecting surface, and shallow subsurface, discontinuities in ferromagnetic materials. Examples of ferromagnetic materials include iron, nickel, cobalt, and some of their alloys. The process puts a magnetic field into the part. The piece can be magnetized by direct or indirect magnetization. Direct magnetization occurs when the electric current is passed through the test object and a magnetic field is formed in the material. The magnetic lines of force are perpendicular to the direction of the electric current, which may be either alternating current (AC) or some form of direct current (DC) (rectified AC). Indirect magnetization occurs when no electric current is passed through the test object, but a magnetic field is applied from an outside source.

The presence of a surface or subsurface discontinuity in the material allows the magnetic flux to leak, since air cannot support as much magnetic field per unit volume as metals.

To identify a leak, ferrous particles, either dry or in a wet suspension, are applied to a part. These are attracted to an area of flux leakage and form what is known as an indication, which is evaluated to determine its nature, cause, and course of action, if any.

== Types of electrical currents used ==
There are several types of electrical currents used in magnetic particle inspection. For a proper current to be selected one needs to consider the part geometry, material, the type of discontinuity one is seeking, and how far the magnetic field needs to penetrate into the part.

- Alternating current (AC) is commonly used to detect surface discontinuities. Using AC to detect subsurface discontinuities is limited due to what is known as the skin effect, where the current runs along the surface of the part. Because the current alternates in polarity at 50 to 60 cycles per second it does not penetrate much past the surface of the test object. This means the magnetic domains will only be aligned equal to the distance AC current penetration into the part. The frequency of the alternating current determines how deep the penetration.
- Full wave DC (FWDC) is used to detect subsurface discontinuities where AC can not penetrate deep enough to magnetize the part at the depth needed. The amount of magnetic penetration depends on the amount of current through the part. DC is also limited on very large cross-sectional parts in terms of how effectively it will magnetize the part.
- Half wave DC (HWDC, pulsating DC) works similar to full wave DC, but allows for detection of surface breaking indications and has more magnetic penetration into the part than FWDC. HWDC is advantageous for inspection process as it actually helps move the magnetic particles during the bathing of the test object. The aid in particle mobility is caused by the half-wave pulsating current waveform. In a typical mag pulse of 0.5 seconds there are 15 pulses of current using HWDC. This gives the particle more of an opportunity to come in contact with areas of magnetic flux leakage.

An AC electromagnet is the preferred method for find surface breaking indication. The use of an electromagnet to find subsurface indications is difficult. An AC electromagnet is a better means to detect a surface indication than HWDC, DC, or permanent magnet, while some form of DC is better for subsurface defects.

== Equipment ==
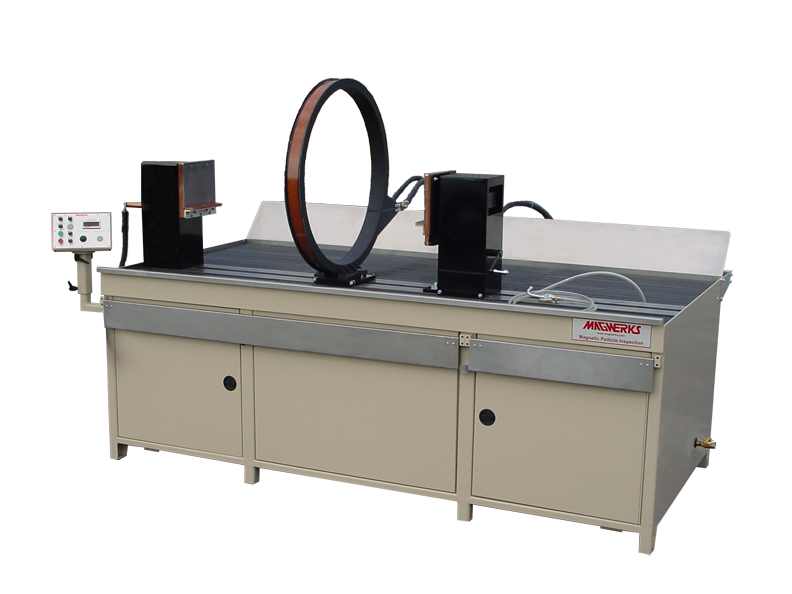
A wet horizontal MPI machine with a 36 in (910 mm) coil

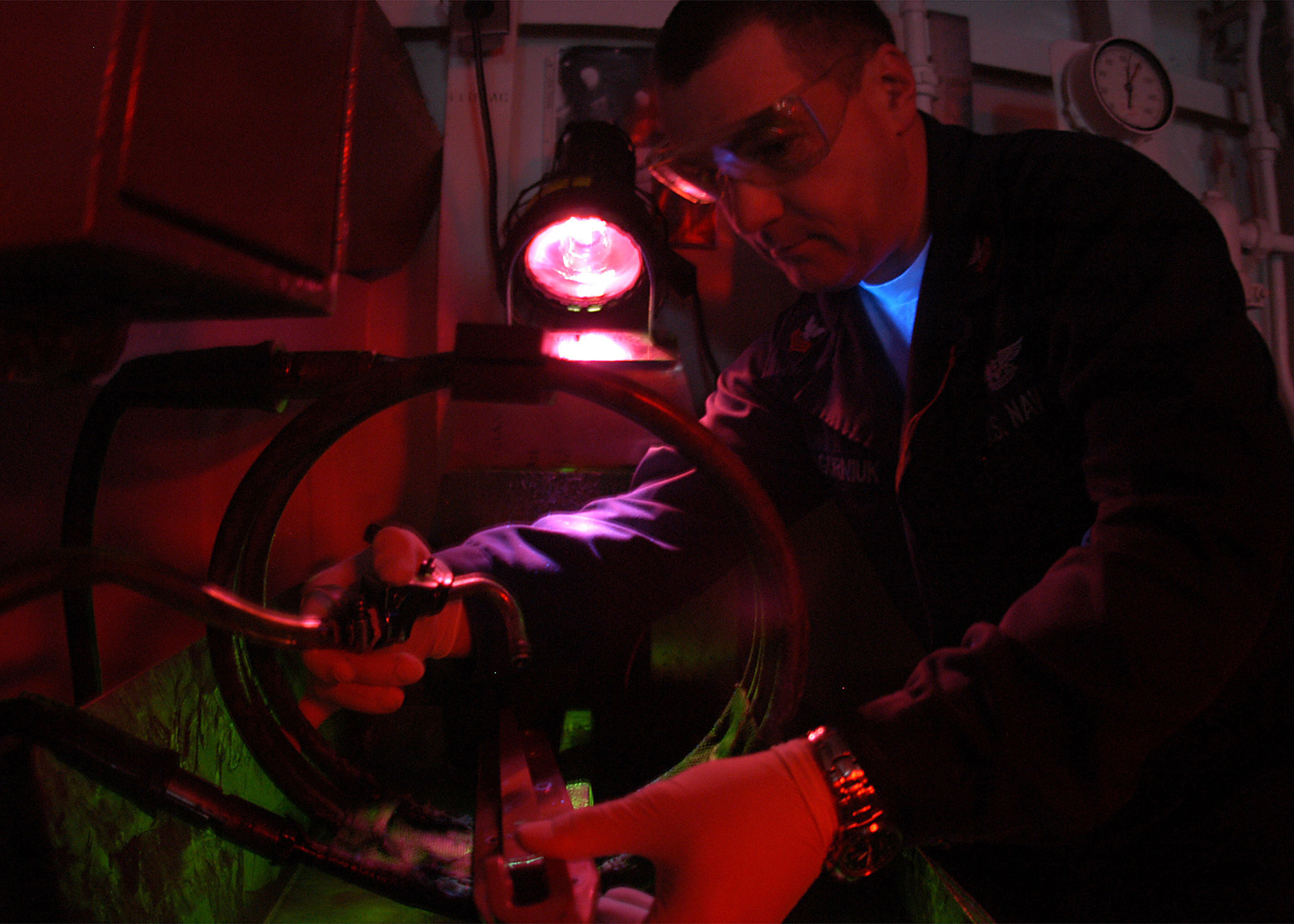
Using a similar machine, a U.S. Navy technician sprays magnetic particles on a test part under ultraviolet light.

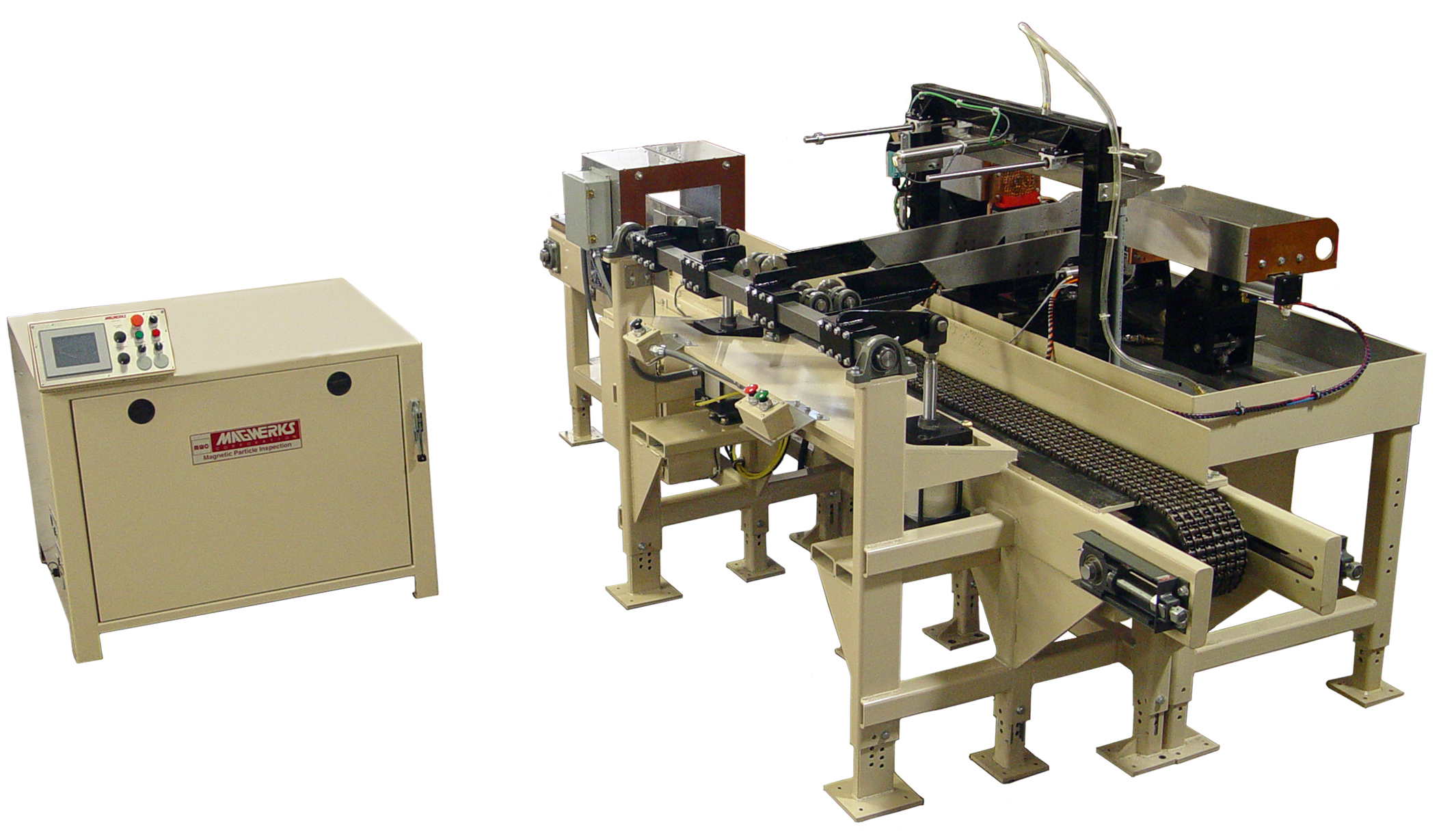
An automatic wet horizontal MPI machine with an external power supply, conveyor, and demagnetizing system. It is used to inspect engine crankshafts.

A wet horizontal MPI machine is the most commonly used mass-production inspection machine. The machine has a head and tail stock where the part is placed to magnetize it. In between the head and tail stock is typically an induction coil, which is used to change the orientation of the magnetic field by 90° from the head stock. Most of the equipment is built for a specific application.

Mobile power packs are custom-built magnetizing power supplies used in wire wrapping applications.

Magnetic yoke is a hand-held device that induces a magnetic field between two poles. Common applications are for outdoor use, remote locations, and weld inspection. The drawback of magnetic yokes is that they only induce a magnetic field between the poles, so large-scale inspections using the device can be time-consuming. For proper inspection the yoke needs to be rotated 90 degrees for every inspection area to detect horizontal and vertical discontinuities. Subsurface detection using a yoke is limited. These systems used dry magnetic powders, wet powders, or aerosols.

== Demagnetizing parts ==
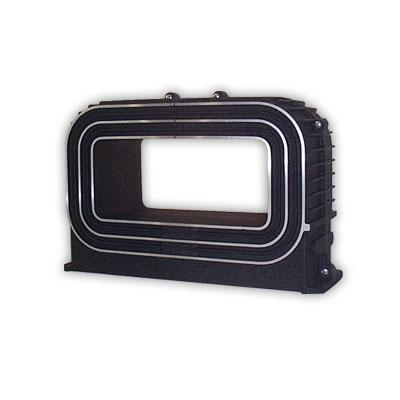
A pull through AC demagnetizing unit

After the part has been magnetized it needs to be demagnetized. This requires special equipment that works the opposite way of the magnetizing equipment. The magnetization is normally done with a high current pulse that reaches a peak current very quickly and instantaneously turns off leaving the part magnetized. To demagnetize a part, the current or magnetic field needed has to be equal to or greater than the current or magnetic field used to magnetize the part. The current or magnetic field is then slowly reduced to zero, leaving the part demagnetized. A popular method to record residual magnetism is by using a Gauss meter.

- AC demagnetizing
  - Pull-through AC demagnetizing coils: seen in the figure to the right are AC powered devices that generate a high magnetic field where the part is slowly pulled through by hand or on a conveyor. The act of pulling the part through and away from the coil's magnetic field slows drops the magnetic field in the part. Note that many AC demagnetizing coils have power cycles of several seconds so the part must be passed through the coil and be several feet (meters) away before the demagnetizing cycle finishes or the part will have residual magnetization.
  - AC decaying demagnetizing: this is built into most single phase MPI equipment. During the process the part is subjected to an equal or greater AC current, after which the current is reduced over a fixed period of time (typically 18 seconds) until zero output current is reached. As AC is alternating from a positive to a negative polarity this will leave the magnetic domains of the part randomized.
  - AC demag does have significant limitations on its ability to demag a part depending on the geometry and the alloys used.
- Reversing full wave DC demagnetizing: this is a demagnetizing method that must be built into the machine during manufacturing. It is similar to AC decaying except the DC current is stopped at intervals of half a second, during which the current is reduced by a quantity and its direction is reversed. Then current is passed through the part again. The process of stopping, reducing and reversing the current will leave the magnetic domains randomized. This process is continued until zero current is passed through the part. The normal reversing DC demag cycle on modern equipment should be 18 seconds or longer. This method of demag was developed to overcome the limitations presented by the AC demag method where part geometry and certain alloys prevented the AC demag method from working.
- Halfwave DC demagnetizing (HWDC): this process is identical to full-wave DC demagnetization, except the waveform is half-wave. This method of demagnetization is new to the industry and only available from a single manufacturer. It was developed to be a cost-effective method to demagnetize without needing a full-wave DC bridge design power supply. This method is only found on single-phase AC/HWDC power supplies. HWDC demagnetization is just as effective as full-wave DC, without the extra cost and added complexity. Of course, other limitations apply due to inductive losses when using HWDC waveform on large-diameter parts. Also, HWDC effectiveness is limited past 410 mm (16 in) diameter using a 12-volt power supply.

== Magnetic particle powder ==
A common particle used to detect cracks is iron oxide, for both dry and wet systems.

- Wet system particle range in size from less than 0.5 micrometers to 10 micrometers for use with water or oil carriers. Particles used in wet systems have pigments applied that fluoresce at 365 nm (ultraviolet A) requiring 1000 μW/cm^{2} (10 W/m^{2}) at the surface of the part for proper inspection. If the particles do not have the correct light applied in a darkroom the particles cannot be detected/seen. It is industry practice to use UV goggles/glasses to filter the UV light and amplify the visible light spectrum (normally green and yellow) created by the fluorescing particles. Green and yellow fluorescence was chosen because the human eye reacts best to these colors.

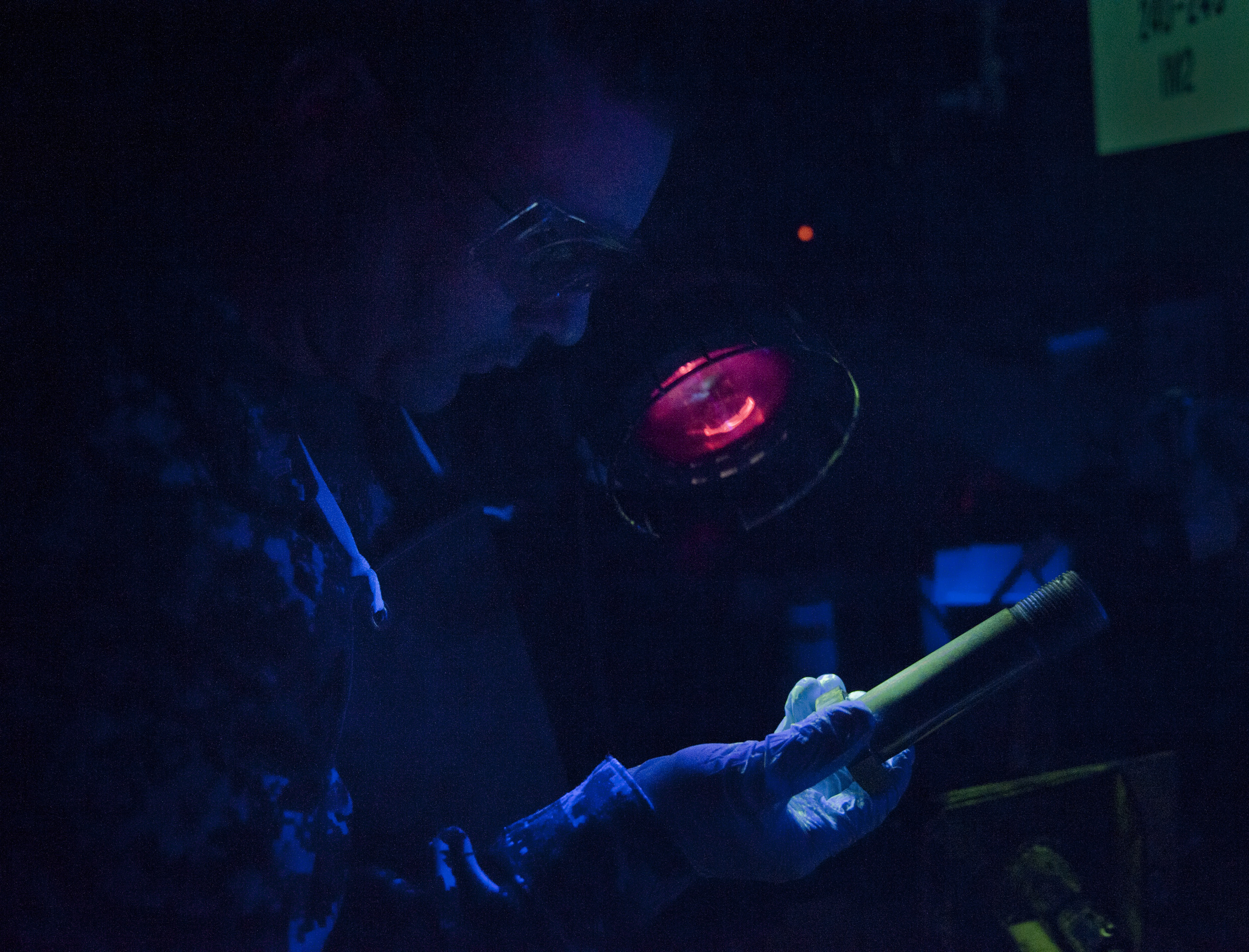
After applying wet magnetic particles, a U.S. navy technician examines a bolt for cracks under ultraviolet light.

- Dry particle powders range in size from 5 to 170 micrometers, designed to be seen in white light conditions. The particles are not designed to be used in wet environments. Dry powders are normally applied using hand-operated air powder applicators.
- Aerosol applied particles are similar to wet systems, sold in premixed aerosol cans similar to hair spray.

=== Magnetic particle carriers ===
It is common industry practice to use specifically designed oil and water-based carriers for magnetic particles. Deodorized kerosene and mineral spirits have not been commonly used in the industry for 40 years. It is dangerous to use kerosene or mineral spirits as a carrier due to the risk of fire.

== Standards ==
International Organization for Standardization (ISO)

- ISO 3059, Non-destructive testing - Penetrant testing and magnetic particle testing - Viewing conditions
- ISO 9934-1, Non-destructive testing - Magnetic particle testing - Part 1: General principles
- ISO 9934-2, Non-destructive testing - Magnetic particle testing - Part 2: Detection media
- ISO 9934-3, Non-destructive testing - Magnetic particle testing - Part 3: Equipment
- ISO 10893-5, Non-destructive testing of steel tubes. Magnetic particle inspection of seamless and welded ferromagnetic steel tubes for the detection of surface imperfections
- ISO 17638, Non-destructive testing of welds - Magnetic particle testing
- ISO 23278, Non-destructive testing of welds - Magnetic particle testing of welds - Acceptance levels

European Committee for Standardization (CEN)

- EN 1330-7, Non-destructive testing - Terminology - Part 7: Terms used in magnetic particle testing
- EN 1369, Founding - Magnetic particle inspection
- EN 10228-1, Non-destructive testing of steel forgings - Part 1: Magnetic particle inspection

American Society of Testing and Materials (ASTM)

- ASTM E709 Guide for Magnetic Particle Testing Examination (main standard)
- ASTM E1444/E1444M Standard Practice for Magnetic Particle Testing for Aerospace
- ASTM A275/A275M Test Method for Magnetic Particle Examination of Steel Forgings
- ASTM A456 Specification for Magnetic Particle Inspection of Large Crankshaft Forgings
- ASTM E543 Practice Standard Specification for Evaluating Agencies that Performing Nondestructive Testing
- ASTM E1316 Terminology for Nondestructive Examinations
- ASTM E2297 Standard Guide for Use of UV-A and Visible Light Sources and Meters used in the Liquid Penetrant and Magnetic Particle Methods

Canadian Standards Association (CSA)

- CSA W59

Society of Automotive Engineers (SAE)

- AMS 2641 Magnetic Particle Inspection Vehicle
- AMS 3040 Magnetic Particles, Nonfluorescent, Dry Method
- AMS 3041 Magnetic Particles, Nonfluorescent, Wet Method, Oil Vehicle, Ready-To-Use
- AMS 3042 Magnetic Particles, Nonfluorescent, Wet Method, Dry Powder
- AMS 3043 Magnetic Particles, Nonfluorescent, Wet Method, Oil Vehicle, Aerosol Packaged
- AMS 3044 Magnetic Particles, Fluorescent, Wet Method, Dry Powder
- AMS 3045 Magnetic Particles, Fluorescent, Wet Method, Oil Vehicle, Ready-To-Use
- AMS 3046 Magnetic Particles, Fluorescent, Wet Method, Oil Vehicle, Aerosol Packaged5
- AMS 5062 Steel, Low Carbon Bars, Forgings, Tubing, Sheet, Strip, and Plate 0.25 Carbon, Maximum
- AMS 5355 Investment Castings
- AMS I-83387 Inspection Process, Magnetic Rubber
- AMS-STD-2175 Castings, Classification and Inspection of AS 4792 Water Conditioning Agents for Aqueous Magnetic Particle Inspection AS 5282 Tool Steel Ring Standard for Magnetic Particle Inspection AS5371 Reference Standards Notched Shims for Magnetic Particle Inspection

United States Military Standard

- A-A-59230 Fluid, Magnetic Particle Inspection, Suspension
