= Magnetic flux leakage prestressed steel =

Non-destructive testing method for prestressing steel

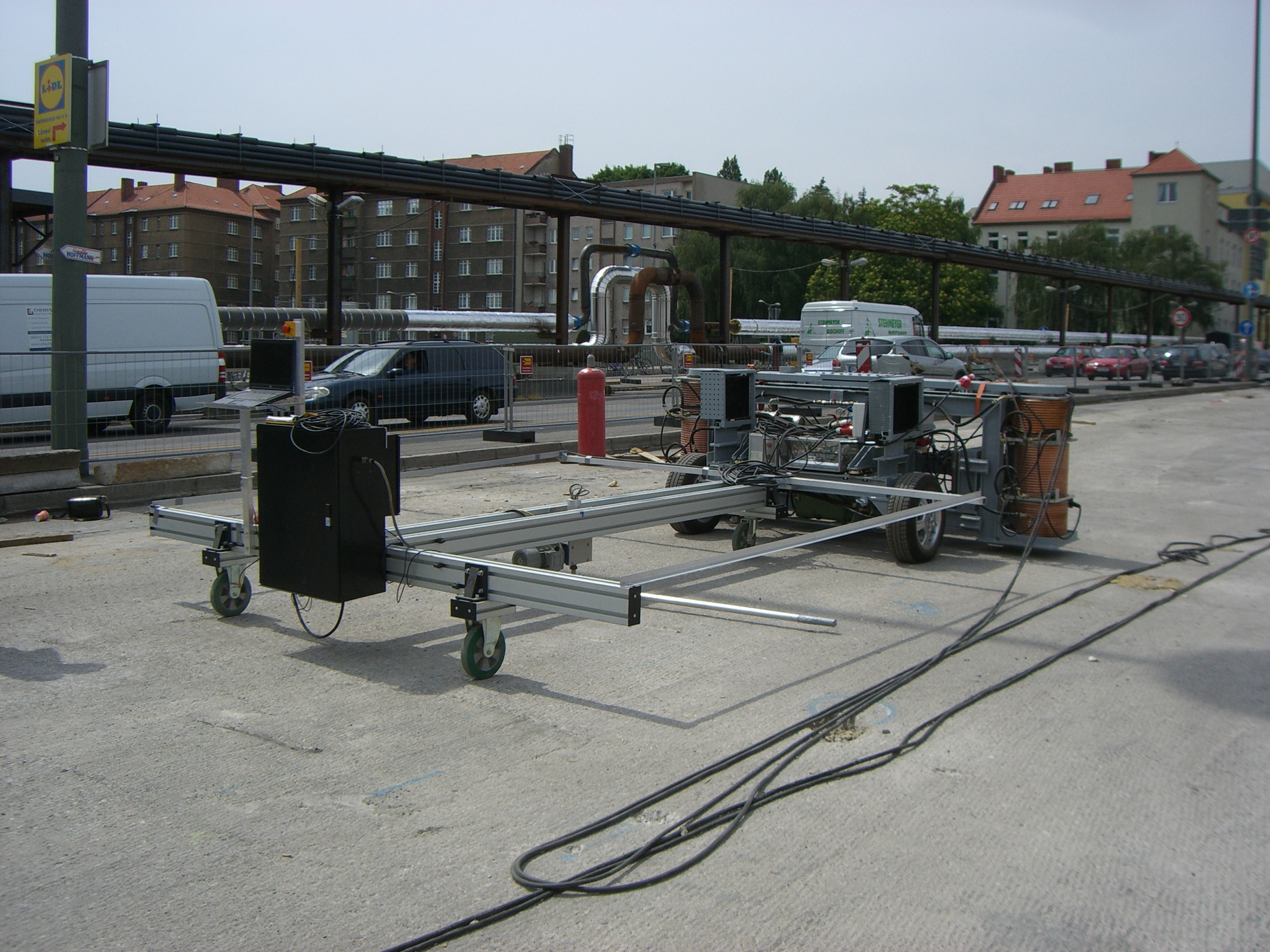
Mobile measurement system used for locating wire breaks in transverse post-tensioning rebars

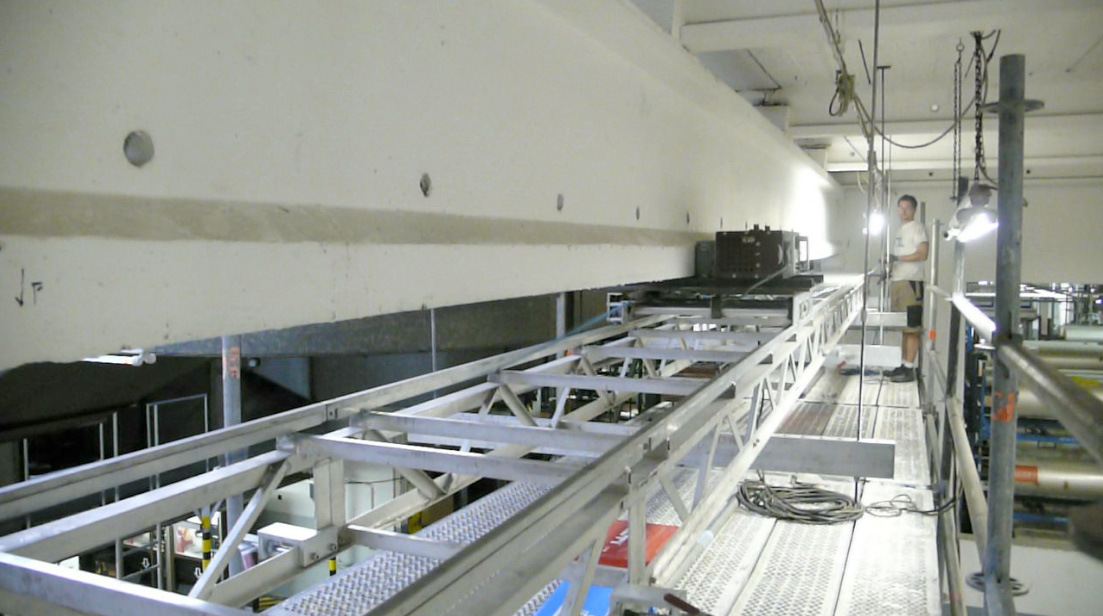
Example of a measurement setup used for prestressing wire break localisation

Magnetic flux leakage inspection of prestressing rebars is a non-destructive testing (NDT) approach used to detect and localise discontinuities (such as fractures, significant cross-sectional loss, or pronounced corrosion-related disturbance zones) in prestressing steel rebars embedded in prestressed concrete members. The method belongs to the broader family of magnetic flux leakage (MFL) techniques, in which a ferromagnetic component is magnetised and local defects create characteristic magnetic flux leakage (stray fields) that can be measured externally and interpreted to localise defects that can degrade the mechanical strength.

== Terminology ==
In German practice the application term Spanndrahtbruchortung (“prestressing wire break location”) is common. Methodologically, the technique is typically described as magnetic flux leakage or magnetic stray-field measurement. Some German sources also refer to a remanent magnetism method (RM method) when remnant magnetisation is used as part of the measurement strategy.

== Background ==
Prestressing steel (wires, strands, or bars) are critical load-bearing components in prestressed concrete. Damage, including fractures, may occur due to corrosion processes (e.g. chloride-induced corrosion), fatigue, or stress corrosion cracking. Because the rebars are embedded in concrete (often within ducts), fractures may not be externally visible; local openings or point inspections can therefore be insufficient where a broader integrity assessment is required.

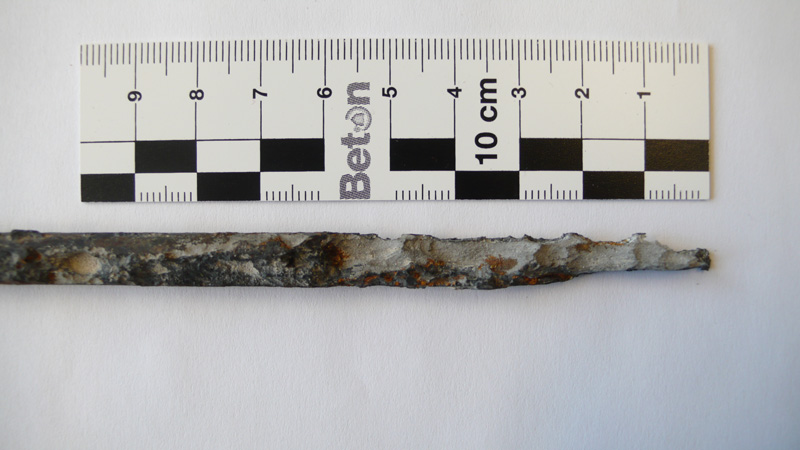
Chloride-related corrosion damage affecting prestressing steel

== Principle of operation ==
A magnetised prestressed steel has a magnetic field. At discontinuities, such as a wire fracture or a pronounced cross-sectional change, magnetic field lines leak from the steel and create a measurable stray field outside. Sensors moved along the rebar line record the magnetic flux density and/or field gradients. The measured signal is influenced by factors such as concrete cover (“lift-off” distance), rebar geometry, magnetisation level, and the presence of nearby ferromagnetic elements (e.g. reinforcement cages, steel inserts) that can superimpose or distort the field.

== Field procedure ==
Typical steps include:

1. Identifying the rebar path using drawings/as-built documentation and (where needed) complementary locating methods (e.g. radar-based techniques).
2. Setting up guidance/transport for the magnetisation unit and sensors along the measurement line.
3. Magnetising the rebar and acquiring stray-field data (in an active field and/or using remnant magnetisation, depending on the system).
4. Signal processing and localisation (filtering, referencing, plausibility checks) to identify characteristic anomalies and estimate their positions.
5. Interpretation and reporting of anomaly locations; structural relevance is typically assessed in conjunction with complementary investigations and engineering evaluation.

== Limitations and influencing factors ==
- Concrete cover and geometry: increasing the distance between sensor and rebar reduces the measurable stray field and can affect detectability.
- Interference from ferromagnetic materials: reinforcement, steel inserts, and nearby metalwork can overlay the signal and complicate interpretation.
- Accessibility: measurement usually requires a practicable scan line along the projected rebar path.
- Interpretation: the method provides anomaly signatures; translating these into structural relevance depends on the structural system and is typically carried out alongside complementary investigations and engineering evaluation.

== Developments ==
Recent research explores higher-sensitivity magnetometry (including quantum sensor concepts) to improve detectability of wire breaks under practical conditions and in challenging configurations (e.g. large cover depths or dense reinforcement).

== See also ==
- Magnetic flux leakage
- Non-destructive testing
- Prestressed concrete
