= Flight qualification =

To flight-qualify is to take a product, process, or material and test it in order to prove that it will withstand the environment of aerodynamic or space flight. This process can include the following tests and processes:

- parts screening
- thermal test
- vacuum test
- vibration test or modal testing
- material analysis

A flight qualification can include a test in the actual desired environment.
