= Water weights =

Weights composed primarily of water used to test structural integrity

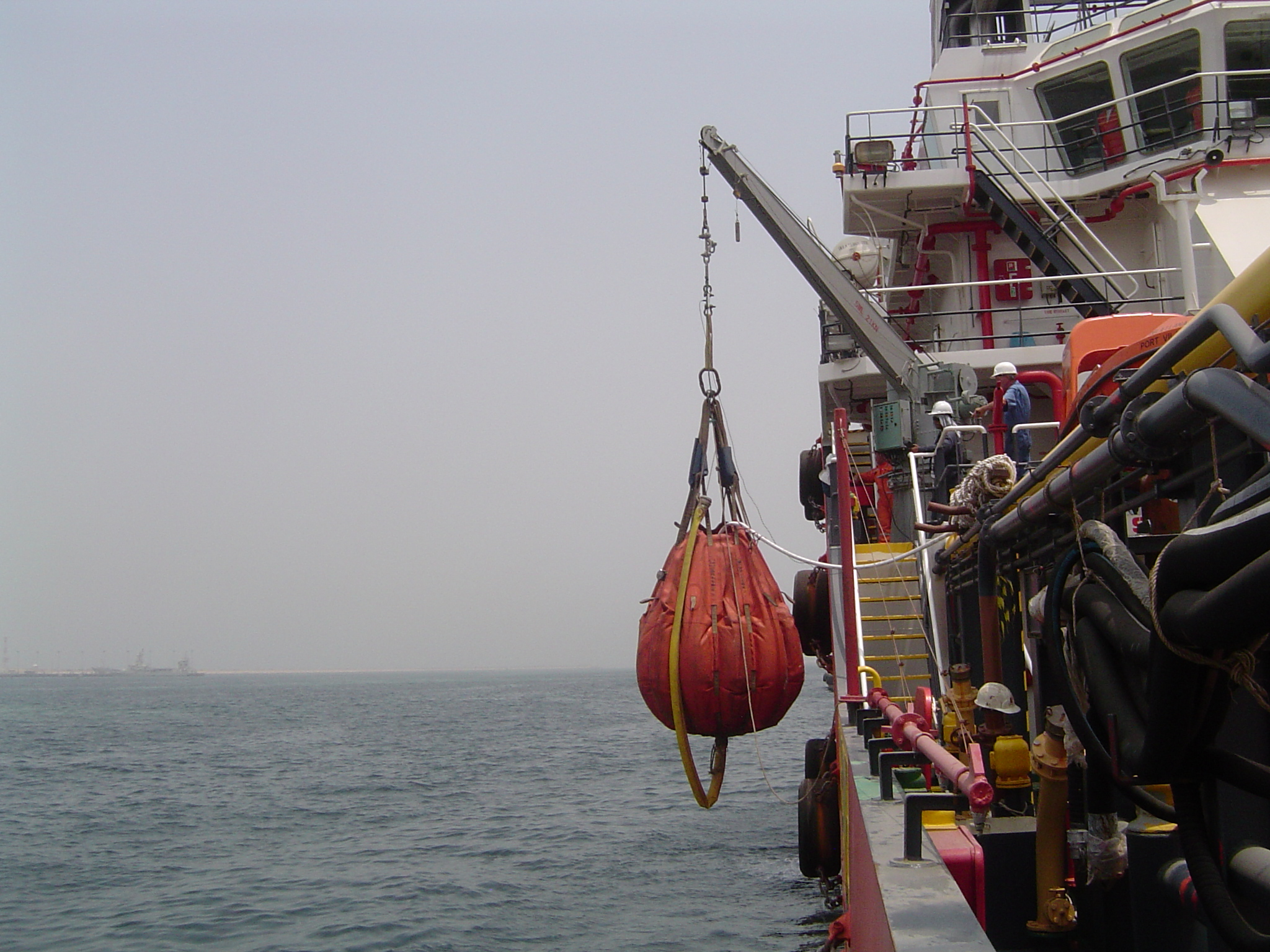
Test of davit with water weight

Water weights are water-filled bags that are designed as a safe, practical and economical method of non-destructive testing and checking the structural integrity of cranes, davits, lifeboats, link spans, ramps and lifts, floors and bridges.

Water weights are a popular alternative to solid weights as they are safer to use and can offer cost savings in transportation, storage, and labor. When performing load tests using water weights, gradual application of the load allows problems to be identified before attaining maximum load.
