= Magnetovision =

Visualization technique

Magnetovision is the measuring technique enabling the visualization of magnetic field distribution in a given space.

== Measuring setup ==
Magnetovision measuring stand consists of a magnetometer, X-Y or X-Y-Z movement mechanism and data processing and visualization system. Following modes of magnetovision signal acquisition are possible:

- magnetometer moves in the measurement area (e.g. over tested object)
- tested object moves against the magnetometer
- array of magnetic field sensors is used

== Magnetometers ==
Typically, following types of sensors may be used:

- magnetoresistance effect based sensors
- fluxgate magnetometers
- Hall-effect sensors
- SQUIDs

== Types ==
There are different modes of magnetovision measurements. Measurements may be performed in 2D (X-Y) or 3D (X-Y-Z). Moreover, measurements of magnetic field may be absolute, differential or gradiometric.

== Applications ==
Magnetovision may be used for:

- nondestructive testing in civil engineering
- detection of dangerous metallic objects
- archeology

== Data fusion ==
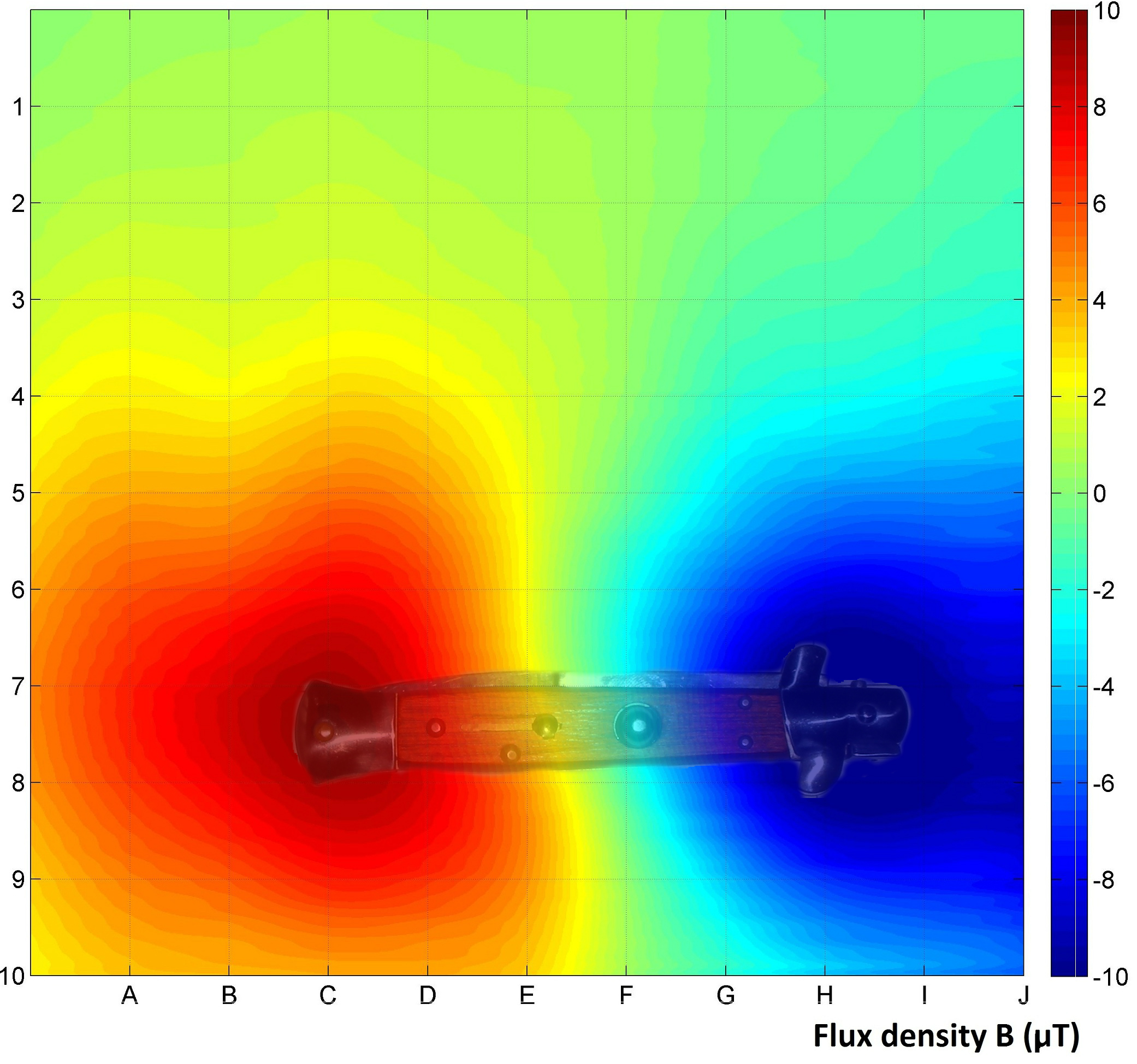
Magnetovision image of the folding knife, merged with the photograph of the actual object's position.

Magnetovision images may be used for data fusion with visual signal. This creates new possibility of presentation of magnetic field distribution for further analyses.
