= Laser ultrasonics =

Laser-ultrasonics uses lasers to generate and detect ultrasonic waves. It is a non-contact technique used to measure materials thickness, detect flaws and carry out materials characterization. The basic components of a laser-ultrasonic system are a generation laser, a detection laser and a detector.

== Ultrasound generation by laser ==
The generation lasers are short pulse (from tens of nanoseconds to femtoseconds) and high peak power lasers. Common lasers used for ultrasound generation are solid state Q-Switched Nd:YAG and gas lasers (CO_{2} or Excimers). The physical principle is of thermal expansion (also called thermoelastic regime) or ablation. In the thermoelastic regime, the ultrasound is generated by the sudden thermal expansion due to the heating of a tiny surface of the material by the laser pulse. If the laser power is sufficient to heat the surface above the material boiling point, some material is evaporated (typically some nanometres) and ultrasound is generated by the recoil effect of the expanding material evaporated. In the ablation regime, a plasma is often formed above the material surface and its expansion can make a substantial contribution to the ultrasonic generation. Consequently the emissivity patterns and modal content are different for the two different mechanisms.

The frequency content of the generated ultrasound is partially determined by the frequency content of the laser pulses with shorter pulses giving higher frequencies. For very high frequency generation (up to 100sGHz) femtosecond lasers are used often in a pump-probe configuration with the detection system (see picosecond ultrasonics).

Historically, fundamental research into the nature of laser-ultrasonics was started in 1979, by Richard J Dewhurst and Stuart B Palmer. They set up a new laboratory in the Department of Applied Physics, University of Hull. Dewhurst provided the laser-matter expertise and Palmer the ultrasound expertise. Investigations were directed towards the development of a scientific insight into physical processes converting laser-matter interaction into ultrasound. The studies were also aimed at assessing the characteristics of the ultrasound propagating from the near field into the far field. Importantly, quantitative measurements were performed between 1979 and 1982. In solids, the measurements included amplitudes of longitudinal and shear waves in absolute terms. Ultrasound generation by a laser pulse for both the thermoelastic regime and the transition to the plasma regime was examined. By comparing measurements with theoretical predictions, a description of the magnitude and direction of stresses leading to ultrasonic generation was presented for the first time. It led to the proposition that laser-generated ultrasound could be regarded as a standard acoustic source. Additionally, they showed that surface modification can sometimes be used to amplify the magnitude of ultrasonic signals.

Their research also included the first quantitative studies of laser induced Rayleigh waves, which can dominate ultrasonic surface waves. In studies beyond 1982, surface waves were shown to have a potential use in non-destructive testing. One type of investigation included surface–breaking crack depth estimations in metals, using artificial cracks. Crack sizing was demonstrated, using wideband laser-ultrasonics. Findings were first reported at a Royal Society meeting in London with detailed publications elsewhere.

Important features of laser ultrasonics were summarised in 1990.

== Ultrasound detection by laser ==
For scientific investigations in the early 1980s, Michelson interferometers were exploited. They were capable of measuring ultrasonic signals quantitatively, in typical ranges of 20 nm down to 5pm. They possessed a broadband frequency response, up to about 50 MHz. Unfortunately, for good signals, they required samples that had polished surfaces. They suffered from serious sensitivity loss when used on rough industrial surfaces. A significant breakthrough for the application of laser ultrasonics came in 1986, when the first optical interferometer capable of reasonable detection sensitivity on rough industrial surfaces was demonstrated. Monchalin et al. at the National Research Council of Canada in Boucherville showed that a Fabry–Pérot interferometer system could assess optical speckle returning from rough surfaces. It provided the impetus for the translation of laser ultrasonics into industrial applications.

Today, ultrasound waves may be detected optically by a variety of techniques. Most techniques use continuous or long pulse (typically of tens of microseconds) lasers but some use short pulses to down convert very high frequencies to DC in a classic pump-probe configuration with the generation. Some techniques (notably conventional Fabry–Pérot detectors) require high frequency stability and this usually implies long coherence length. Common detection techniques include: interferometry (homodyne or heterodyne or Fabry–Pérot), optical beam deflection (GCLAD), knife edge detection, and air-coupled optical microphones based on refractive-index modulation in a Fabry–Pérot cavity.

With GCLAD, (Gas-coupled laser acoustic detection), a laser beam is passed through a region where one wants to measure or record the acoustic changes. The ultrasound waves create changes in the air's index of refraction. When the laser encounters these changes, the beam slightly deflects and displaces to a new course. This change is detected and converted to an electric signal by a custom-built photodetector. This enables high sensitivity detection of ultrasound on rough surfaces for frequencies up to 10 MHz.

Optical ultrasound microphones also rely on refractive index changes in air caused by ultrasound waves. These changes are detected using a miniature, rigid Fabry–Pérot interferometer, where they modulate the intensity of a laser beam. A photodiode converts this modulation into an electrical signal. Unlike conventional laser interferometers, and similar to GCLAD, the detection laser does not interact with the specimen's surface, allowing ultrasound detection on optically rough surfaces using a localized probe.

In practice the choice of technique is often determined by the physical optics and the sample (surface) condition. Many techniques relying on light reflected from the specimen fail to work well on rough surfaces (e.g. simple interferometers) and there are many different schemes to overcome this problem. For instance, photorefractive crystals and four wave mixing are used in an interferometer to compensate for the effects of surface roughness. These techniques are usually expensive in terms of monetary cost and in terms of light budget (thus requiring more laser power to achieve the same signal to noise under ideal conditions).

At low to moderate frequencies (say < 1 GHz), the mechanism for detection is the movement of the surface of the sample. At high frequencies (say >1 GHz), other mechanisms may come into play (for instance modulation of the sample refractive index with stress).

Under ideal circumstances most detection techniques relying on light reflected from the specimecan be considered theoretically as interferometers and, as such, their ultimate sensitivities are all roughly equal. This is because, in all these techniques, interferometry is used to linearize the detection transfer function and when linearized, maximum sensitivity is achieved. Under these conditions, photon shot noise dominates the sensitivity and this is fundamental to these detection techniques. However, the ultimate limit is determined by the phonon shot noise. Since the phonon frequency is many orders of magnitude lower than the photon frequency, the ultimate sensitivity of ultrasonic detection can be much higher. The usual method for increasing the sensitivity of optical detection is to use more optical power. However, the shot noise limited SNR is proportional to the square root of the total detection power. Thus, increasing optical power has limited effect, and for techniques illuminating the specimen with the detection laser, damaging power levels are easily reached before achieving an adequate SNR. Consequently, such techniques can have lower SNR than non-optical contacting techniques. Optical generation (at least in the firmly thermoelastic regime) is proportional to the optical power used and it is generally more efficient to improve the generation rather than the detection (again the limit is the damage threshold).

Techniques like CHOTs (cheap optical transducers) can overcome the limit of optical detection sensitivity by passively amplifying the amplitude of vibration before optical detection and can result in an increase in sensitivity by several orders of magnitude.

== Ultrasonic laser technique operation ==
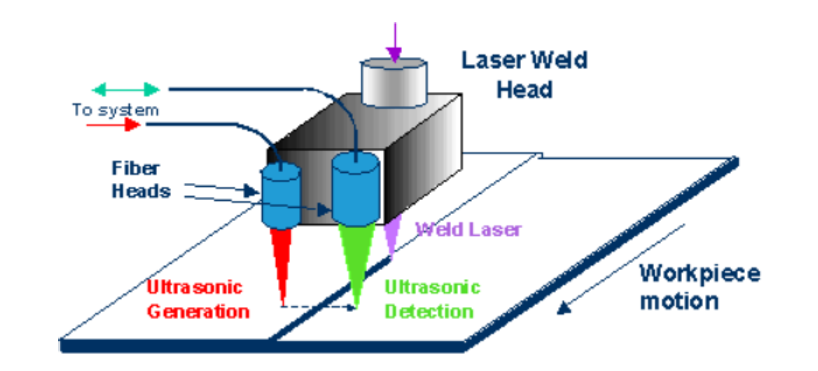
Ultrasonic laser set-up

The "Laser Ultrasonic" technique is part of those measurement techniques known as "non-destructive techniques or NDT", that is, methods which do not change the state of measurand itself. Laser ultrasonics is a contactless ultrasonic inspection technique based on excitation and ultrasound measurement using two lasers. A laser pulse is directed onto the sample under test and the interaction with the surface generates an ultrasonic pulse that propagates through the material. The reading of the vibrations produced by the ultrasounds can be subsequently measured by the self-mixing vibrometer: the high performance of the instrument makes it suitable for an accurate measurement of the ultrasonic wave and therefore for a modeling of the characteristics of the sample. When the laser beam hits the surface of the material, its behavior may vary according to the power of the laser used. In the case of high power, there is a real "ablation" or "vaporization" of the material at the point of incidence between the laser and the surface: this causes the disappearance of a small portion of material and a small recall force, due to compression longitudinal, which would be the origin of the ultrasonic wave. This longitudinal wave tends to propagate in the normal direction to the surface of the material, regardless of the angle of incidence of the laser: this would allow to accurately estimate the thickness of the material, knowing the speed of propagation of the wave, without worrying about the angle of incidence. The use of a high power laser, with consequent vaporization of the material, is the optimal way to obtain an ultrasonic response from the object. However, to fall within the scope of non-destructive measurements, it is preferred to avoid this phenomenon by using low power lasers. In this case, the generation of ultrasound takes place thanks to the local overheating of the point of incidence of the laser: the cause of wave generation is now the thermal expansion of the material. In this way there is both the generation of waves longitudinal, similarly to the previous case, and the generation of transverse waves, whose angle with the normal direction to the surface depends on the material. After a few moments the thermal energy dissipates, leaving the surface intact: in this way the measurement is repeatable an infinite number of times (assuming the use of a material sufficiently resistant to thermal stresses) and non-destructive, as required in almost all areas of application of this technology. The movement of the object causes a shift in the phase of the signal, which cannot be identified directly by an optical receiver: to do this it is first necessary to transform the phase modulation into an amplitude modulation (in this case, in a modulation of luminous intensity ). Ultrasound detection can therefore be divided into 3 steps: the conversion from ultrasound to phase-modulated optical signal, the transition from phase modulation to amplitude and finally the reading of the amplitude modulated signal with consequent conversion into an electrical signal.

== Industrial applications ==
Well established applications of laser-ultrasonics are composite inspections for the aerospace industry and on-line hot tube thickness measurements for the metallurgical industry. Optical generation and detection of ultrasound offers scanning techniques to produce ultrasonic images known as B- and C-scans, and for TOFD (time-of-flight-diffraction) studies. One of the first demonstrations on small defects (as small as 3mm x 3mm) in composites was demonstrated by Dewhurst and Shan in 1993, for which they were awarded an outstanding paper award by the American Society for Non-Destructive Testing in 1994. This was also the time when significant developments on composite examinations were developed from the National Research Council of Canada and elsewhere. A wide range of applications have since been described in the literature. In 2022 the first online grain size gauge based on laser ultrasonics was installed in the hot strip mill in Borlänge Sweden to monitor the grain size along the length of the steel strip after the last stand.
