= Active thermography =

Materials testing procedure

Active thermography is an advanced nondestructive testing procedure, which uses a thermographic measurement of a tested material thermal response after its external excitation. This principle can be used also for non-contact infrared non-destructive testing (IRNDT) of materials.

The IRNDT method is based on an excitation of a tested material by an external source, which brings some energy to the material. Halogen lamps, flash-lamps, ultrasonic horn or other sources can be used as the excitation source for the IRNDT. The excitation causes a tested material thermal response, which is measured by an infrared camera. It is possible to obtain information about the tested material surface and sub-surface defects or material inhomogeneities by using a suitable combination of excitation source, excitation procedure, infrared camera and evaluation method.

Modern thermographic systems with high-speed and high-sensitivity IR cameras extend the possibilities of the inspection method. Modularity of the systems allows their usage for research and development applications as well as in modern industrial production lines.

Thermovision nondestructive testing of components can be carried out on a wide range of various materials. Thermographic inspection of material can be regarded as a method of infrared defectoscopy, that is capable of revealing material imperfections such as cracks, defects, voids, cavities and other inhomogeneities. The thermographic testing can be provided on individual components in a laboratory or directly on technology facilities that are in duty.

== Theory ==
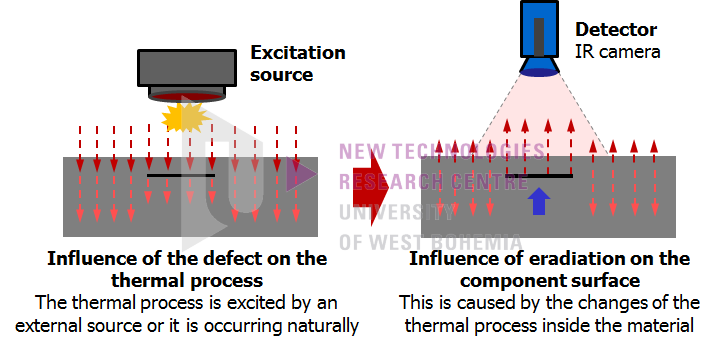
Scheme of the active thermography principle.

Active thermography uses an external source for measured object excitation, that means introducing an energy into the object. The excitation sources can be classified by the principles:

- optical radiation or microwaves absorption,
- electromagnetic induction,
- elastic waves transformation (e.g. ultrasound),
- convection (e.g. hot air),
- plastic deformation transformation (thermoplastic effect during mechanical loading).

Various excitation sources can be used for the active thermography and nondestructive testing, for example laser heating, flash lamps, halogen lamps, electrical heating, ultrasonic horn, eddy currents, microwaves, and others. The measured object can be heated by an external source directly, e.g. by halogen lamps or hot air. The material inhomogeneities or defects cause a distortion of the temperature field. This distortion is detected as temperature differences on the material surface. Another possibility is to use thermophysical processes in the material, where mechanical or electrical energy is transformed into thermal energy due to defects and inhomogeneities. It creates local temperature sources, which cause temperature differences detected on the object surface by infrared techniques, such as in the case of ultrasound excitation.

== Methods ==
A lot of methods were developed for active thermography for the nondestructive testing measurement evaluation. The evaluation methods selection depends on application, used excitation source and excitation type (pulse, periodic, continuous). In the simplest case, the response is evident from a thermogram directly. However, it is necessary to use advanced analysis techniques in most cases. The most common methods include Lock-In, Pulse or Transient (Step thermography) evaluation techniques, with continuous excitation used in some cases:

- Lock-In thermography (periodic excitation method). A modulated periodic source is used for the excitation. The phase and amplitude shift of the measured signal are evaluated and the analysis can be done by various techniques. Halogen lamps, LED lamps, ultrasound, laser or an electric current are suitable excitation sources. It has the advantage that it can be used on large surfaces, and it puts a low thermal energy on the part being inspected. The disadvantage is a longer measurement time and dependence of detection capabilities on a geometrical orientation of defects (except of an indirect excitation such as ultrasound). The Lock-In method is suitable for testing components with a low thermal diffusivity and it has many modifications for various specific applications (such as Lock-In Ref, Lock-In Online, etc.).
- Pulse thermography (pulse method). A very short pulse – usually in the units of milliseconds – is used to excite the object. The cooling process is then analyzed. A flash lamp is typically used as an excitation source. The advantage of this method is the speed of the analysis and a possibility to estimate the defects depth. The disadvantage is a limited depth of the analysis, a limited area that can be inspected (with regard to a usable power of excitation sources) and a dependence of detection capabilities on geometrical orientation of defects.
- Transient thermography (step thermography, thermal wave method). In principle, the excitation and evaluation are similar to the pulse thermography, however, the pulse length is much bigger. Less powerful excitation sources are required compared to the pulse thermography. It is therefore possible to analyze larger areas and the measurement time is shorter than in the case of Lock-In thermography. As in the pulse thermography, the sensitivity of the method is limited by the geometrical orientation of defects. Halogen lamps are the suitable excitation source for this type of evaluation.
- Continual excitation. The simplest method usable only in special applications.

A high-speed cooled infrared camera with a high sensitivity is commonly used for IRNDT applications. However, an uncooled bolometric infrared camera can be used for specific applications. It can significantly reduce acquisition costs of the measurement system.

The IR nondestructive testing system are usually modular. It means that various excitation sources can be combined with various infrared cameras and various evaluation methods depending on application, tested material, measuring time demands, size of a tested area, etc. The modularity allows universal usage of the system for various industrial, scientific and research applications.

== Applications ==
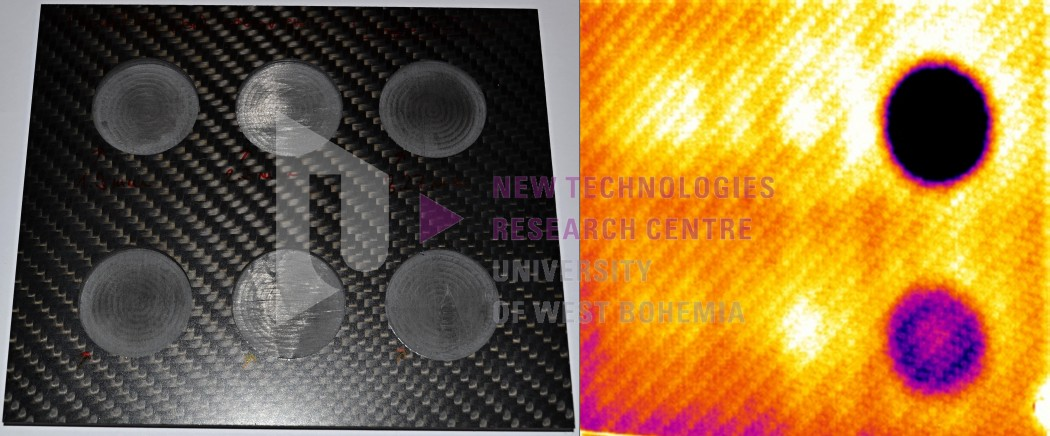
Demonstration of tested specimen and IRNDT analysis results.

IRNDT (infra-red nondestructive testing) method is suitable for detection and inspection of cracks, defects, cavities, voids and inhomogeneities in material, it is also possible to use the method for inspection of welded joints of metal and plastic parts, inspection of solar cells and solar panels, determination of internal structure of material etc.

The main advantage of IRNDT method is availability for inspection of various materials in wide range of industrial and research applications. IRNDT measurement is fast, nondestructive and noncontact. Restrictive condition for IRNDT method is inspection depth combined with dimension and orientation of defect/crack/inhomogeneity in material.

=== Inspection of laser welded plastic parts ===
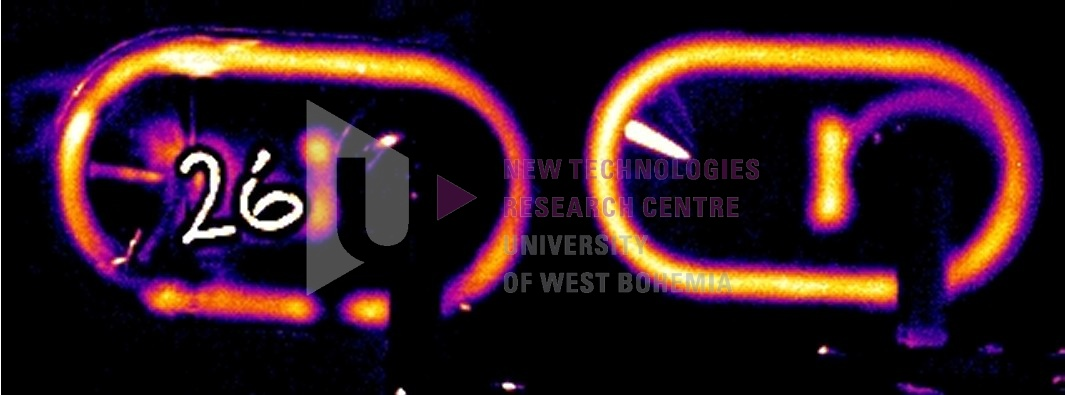
IRNDT analysis of laser welded plastic part with a defective weld and with a correct weld.

Laser welding of plastics is a progressive technology of connecting materials with different optical properties. Classical methods for testing of welding performance and weld joints quality – such as the metallographic cut microscopic analysis or X-ray tomography – are not suitable for routine measurements. Pulse IRNDT analysis can be successfully used for weld inspection in many cases.

The images show an example of plastic parts inspection with a defective weld and with a correct weld. The gaps in the defective weld and the correct uninterrupted weld line are both well visible in the results of the IRNDT flash-pulse analysis.

=== Inspection of laser welded joints ===
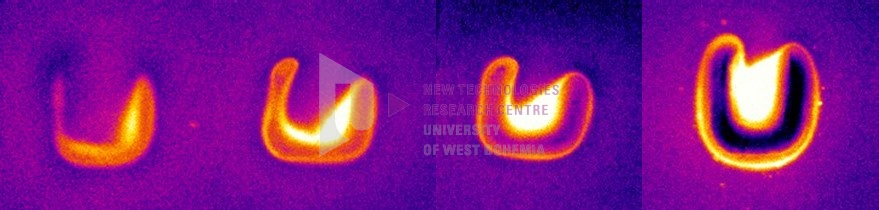
IRNDT evaluation with an indication of weld imperfections and a correct weld of lap joint.

Laser beam welding is a modern technology of fusion welding. Currently finds its wide usage not only in the field of scientific research but also establishes itself in a variety of industries. Among the most frequent users belong the automotive industry, which due to its stable continuous innovation enables fast implementation of advanced technologies in their production. It is clear that laser welding significantly enhances engineering designs and thus brings a number of new products which previously could not be made by conventional methods.

The laser welding can produce quality welds of different types, both extremely thin and thick blanks. Weldable are common carbon steels, stainless steels, aluminum and its alloys, copper, titanium and last but not least, special materials and its combinations.

An integral part of the weldment production is a quality control. Unlike conventional non-destructive test methods, IRNDT is used not only after the laser welding process, but also during it. This makes possible to decide whether or not to the weldment comply with established quality criteria during manufacture process.

=== Solar cells testing ===
Active thermography, particularly lock-in thermography, is widely employed for inspecting solar cells. While effective, lock-in thermography often requires physical contact with the solar cell for excitation. However, techniques that involve periodic excitation using light sources allow for non-contact testing of electrode-free cells. Common methods such as Illuminated Lock-In Thermography (ILIT) and Open Circuit Voltage Illuminated Lock-In Thermography (VOC-ILIT) are used to investigate defects or issues like ohmic shunts, cracks, open or short circuits, and degradation in photovoltaic materials. Pulsed thermography, another method under investigation, provides a non-contact alternative with significantly reduced inspection times; however, it usually offers lower detectability than the ILIT method.
