= Thermographic inspection =

Thermographic inspection refers to the nondestructive testing (NDT) of parts, materials or systems through the imaging of the temperature fields, gradients and/or patterns ("thermograms") at the object's surface. It is distinguished from medical thermography by the subjects being examined: thermographic inspection generally examines inanimate objects, while medical thermography generally examines living organisms. Generally, thermographic inspection is performed using an infrared sensor (thermographic camera).

== Terminology ==
Thermography refers to the visualization of thermograms, and encompasses all thermographic inspection techniques regardless of the technique used. For instance, a temperature sensitive coating applied to a surface to measure its temperature fields is a thermographic inspection contact technique based on heat conduction, and no infrared sensor is involved.

Infrared thermography specifically refers to a nonintrusive, noncontact mapping of thermograms on the surface of objects using a detector that is sensitive to infrared radiation.

There are many other terms widely used, all referring to infrared thermography; the adoption of specific term(s) depends on the author's background and preferences. For instance, video thermography and thermal imaging draw attention to the acquisition of a temporal sequence of images that may be displayed as a movie. Pulse-echo thermography and thermal wave imaging are adopted to emphasize the wave nature of infrared heat. Pulsed video thermography, transient thermography, and flash thermography are used when the specimen is stimulated using a short energy pulse.

== Characteristics ==
When compared with other classical NDT techniques such as ultrasonic or radiographic testing, thermographic inspection is safe, nonintrusive, and usually noncontact, allowing the detection of relatively shallow subsurface defects (a few millimeters in depth) under large surfaces (typically covering an area of 30 by 30 cm (12 by 12 in) at once, although inspection of larger surfaces is possible) and quickly (from a fraction of a second to a few minutes depending on the configuration).

== Techniques ==
In addition, there are two mutually exclusive approaches in thermographic inspection:

1. passive, in which the features of interest are naturally at a higher or lower temperature than the background and no energy is introduced to the system being inspected. For example, the surveillance of people on a scene using a thermal imaging camera.
2. active, in which an energy source is required to produce a thermal contrast between the feature of interest and the background. For example, internal flaws in an aircraft part may be identified by exciting the part with ultrasonic energy; the flaw responds to the ultrasonic energy through frictional heating, which can then be detected with a thermal imaging camera.

=== Passive techniques ===
Typically, passive techniques display information from an infrared sensor on a monitor; these images can be visualized in black and white or in false color. Passive techniques are capable of detecting temperature differences as small as 0.01 °C above or below ambient temperatures.

=== Active techniques ===
Infrared thermgography techniques

Active techniques may be further subdivided depending on the type of energy imparted (typically, optical or acoustic), whether energy is applied externally or internally, and mode of excitation.

A wide variety of energy sources can be used to induce a thermal contrast between defective and non-defective zones that can be divided in external, if the energy is delivered to the surface and then propagated through the material until it encounters a flaw; or internal, if the energy is injected into the specimen in order to stimulate exclusively the defects. Typically, external excitation is performed with optical devices such as photographic flashes (for heat pulsed stimulation) or halogen lamps (for periodic heating), whereas internal excitation can be achieved by means of mechanical oscillations, with a sonic or ultrasonic transducer for both burst and amplitude modulated stimulation.

As depicted in the figure, there are three classical active thermographic techniques based on these two excitation modes: lock-in (or modulated) thermography and pulsed thermography, which are optical techniques applied externally; and vibrothermography, which uses ultrasonic waves (amplitude modulated or pulses) to excite internal features. In vibrothermography, an external mechanical energy source induces a temperature difference between the defective and non-defective areas of the object. In this case, the temperature difference is the main factor that causes the emission of a broad electromagnetic spectrum of infrared radiation, which is not visible to the human eye. The locations of the defects can then be detected by infrared cameras through the process of mapping temperature distribution on the surface of the object.

== See also ==
- Thermography
- Infrared camera
- Infrared detector
- Infrared Non-Destructive Testing
