= Infrared and thermal testing =

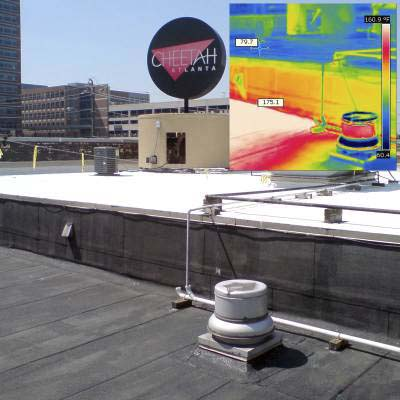
Inset shows false color infrared thermograph of a roof on a sunny day; the white surfaces (colored blue in the thermograph) have been coated with an elastomer to reduce solar loading and have a surface temperature of approximately 60 °F (16 °C); the gray surfaces (colored red/white in the thermogram) are a standard asphalt (bitumen) coating and have a surface temperature of approximately 160 °F (71 °C).

Infrared and thermal testing refer to passive thermographic inspection techniques, a class of nondestructive testing designated by the American Society for Nondestructive Testing (ASNT). Infrared thermography is the science of measuring and mapping surface temperatures.

"Infrared thermography, a nondestructive, remote sensing technique, has proved to be an effective, convenient, and economical method of testing concrete. It can detect internal voids, delaminations, and cracks in concrete structures such as bridge decks, highway pavements, garage floors, parking lot pavements, and building walls. As a testing technique, some of its most important qualities are that (1) it is accurate; (2) it is repeatable; (3) it need not inconvenience the public; and (4) it is economical."

== Principles ==
There are three ways of transferring thermal energy:

1. conduction
2. convection
3. radiation

All objects emit electromagnetic radiation of a wavelength dependent on the object's temperature. The wavelength of the radiation is inversely proportional to the temperature. According to thermodynamics, emitted energy will flow from warmer to cooler areas, and the rate of energy transfer will vary according to the efficiency of the heat transfer processes and the insulating effects of the material through which energy is flowing. In principle, a targeted object or feature will have different thermal properties than its surroundings; for instance, a buried metallic pipe conducts heat more readily than the surrounding soil, so if the fluid it is carrying is at a different temperature than the ambient conditions, the pipe will be visible to a thermal imaging sensor without having to perform an excavation to locate the pipe.

Various types of construction materials have different insulating abilities. In addition, differing types of pipeline defects have different insulating values and/or vary in the magnitude of energy supplied. Because of the potential heterogeneities in the surrounding pipe (i.e., different types of soils), it can be difficult to distinguish targeted objects from background noise.

=== Sensitivity ===
An infrared thermographic scanning system can measure and view temperature patterns based upon temperature differences as small as a few hundredths of a degree Celsius. Infrared thermographic testing may be performed during day or night, depending on environmental conditions and the desired results.

=== In practice ===
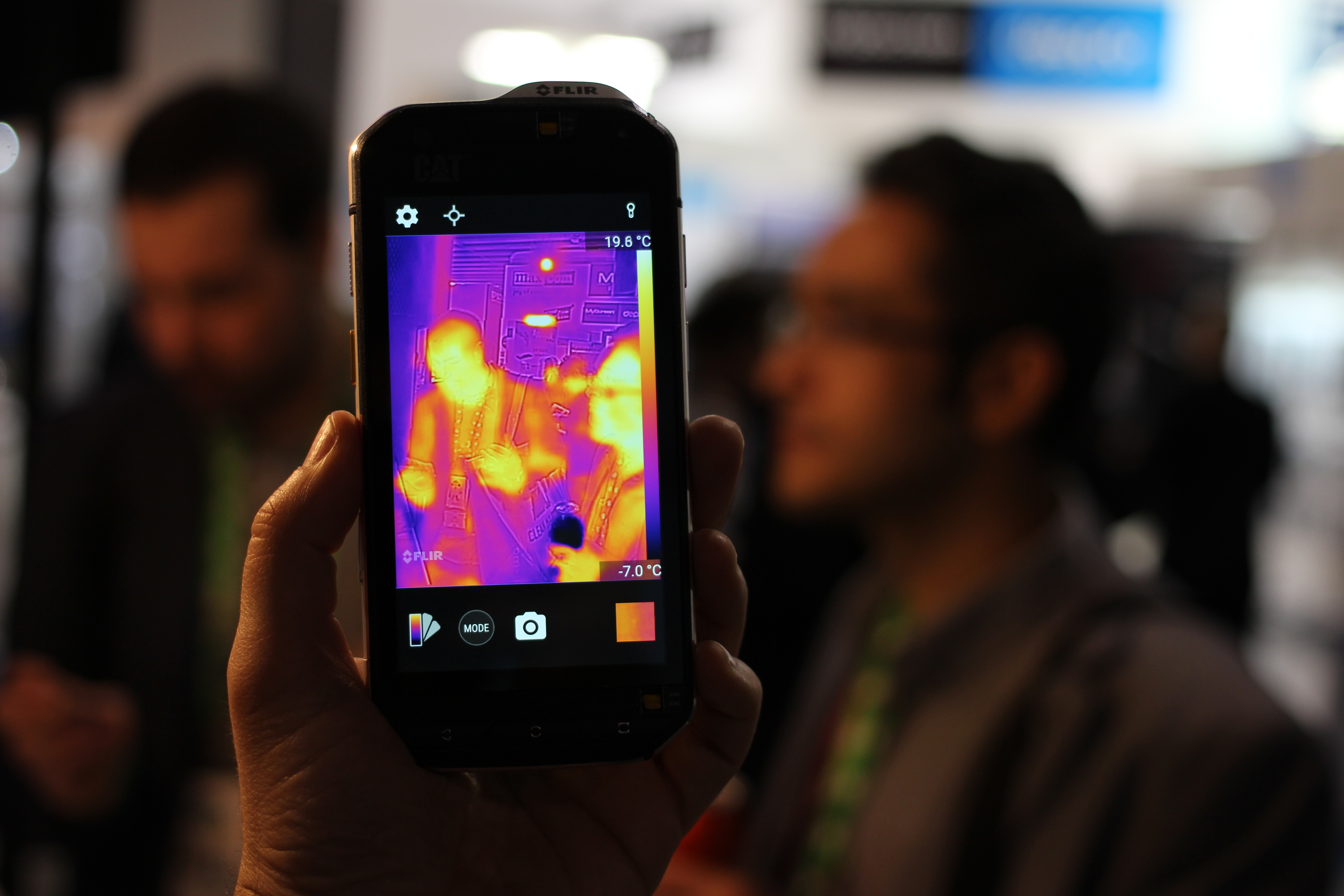
This CAT S60 smartphone is equipped with a thermographic camera from FLIR Systems.

In infrared thermography, thermal radiation is detected and measured with infrared imagers, also known as thermographic cameras or radiometers. The imagers contain an infrared detector that converts the emitted radiation into electrical signals that are displayed on a color or black and white computer display monitor.

After the thermal data is processed, it can be displayed on a monitor in multiple shades of gray scale or color. The colors displayed on the thermogram are arbitrarily set by the Thermographer to best illustrate the infrared data being analyzed.

== Sample applications ==
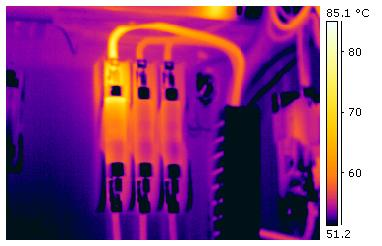
False-color thermograph of electrical equipment, illustrating "hot spot"

A typical application for regularly available IR Thermographic equipment is looking for "hot spots" in electrical equipment, which illustrates high resistance areas in electrical circuits. These "hot spots" are usually measured in the range of 40 to 150 °C (104 to 302 °F) above ambient temperatures.

When engineers use proprietary systems to locate subsurface targets such as underground storage tanks (USTs), pipelines, pipeline leaks and their plumes, and hidden tunnels, their locations are identified by temperature patterns typically in the range of 0.01 °C to 1 °C above or below ambient temperatures.

=== Roofing ===
In this roofing investigation application, infrared thermographic data was collected during daytime hours, on both sunny and rainy days. This data collection time allowed for solar heating of the roof, and any entrapped water within the roofing system, during the daylight hours. IR data was observed until the roof had sufficiently warmed to allow detection of the entrapped wet areas because of their ability to collect and store more heat than the dry insulated areas. The wet areas would also transfer the heat at a faster rate than the dry insulated roof areas. At this point in time, the wet areas showed up as warmer roof surface temperatures than the surrounding dry background areas of the roof.

During the rainy day, with minimum solar loading, any entrapped leak plumes would become evident because of their cooler temperature as compared to the dry roof areas

=== Pipeline testing ===
An infrared thermographic scanning system measures surface temperatures only. But the surface temperatures that are measured on the surface of the ground, above a buried pipeline, are, to a great extent, dependent upon the subsurface conditions.

Good solid backfill should have the least resistance to conduction of energy and the convection gas radiation effects should be negligible. The various types of problems associated with soil erosion and poor backfill surrounding buried pipelines increase the insulating ability of the soil, by reducing the energy conduction properties, without substantially increasing the convection effects. This is because dead air spaces do not allow the formation of convection currents.

In order to have an energy flow, there must be an energy source. Since buried pipeline testing can involve large areas, the heat source has to be low cost and able to give the ground surface above the pipeline an even distribution of heat. The sun fulfills both of these requirements. The ground surface reacts, storing or transmitting the energy received.

For pipelines carrying fluids at temperatures above or below the ambient ground temperatures (i.e., steam, oil, liquefied gases, or chemicals), an alternative is to use the heat sinking ability of the earth to draw heat from the pipeline under test. The crucial point to remember is that the energy must be flowing through the ground and fluids.

Ground cover must be evaluated for temperature differentials (i.e., anomalies such as high grass or surface debris), as to how it may affect the surface condition of the test area. Of the three methods of energy transfer, radiation is the method that has the most profound effect upon the ability of the surface to transfer energy. The ability of a material to radiate energy is measured by the emissivity of the material. This is defined as the ability of the material to release energy as compared to a perfect blackbody radiator. This is strictly a surface property. It normally exhibits itself in higher values for rough surfaces and lower values for smooth surfaces. For example, rough concrete may have an emissivity of 0.95 while a shiny piece of tinfoil may have an emissivity of only 0.05. In practical terms, this means that when looking at large areas of ground cover, the engineer in charge of testing must be aware of differing surface textures caused by such things as broom roughed spots, tire rubber tracks, oil spots, loose sand and dirt on the surface and the height of grassy areas.

== Standards ==
International Organization for Standardization (ISO)

- ISO 6781, Thermal insulation - Qualitative detection of thermal irregularities in building envelopes - Infrared method
- ISO 18434-1, Condition monitoring and diagnostics of machines - Thermography - Part 1: General procedures
- ISO 18436-7, Condition monitoring and diagnostics of machines - Requirements for qualification and assessment of personnel - Part 7: Thermography
