= Nondestructive testing =

Type of analysis technique

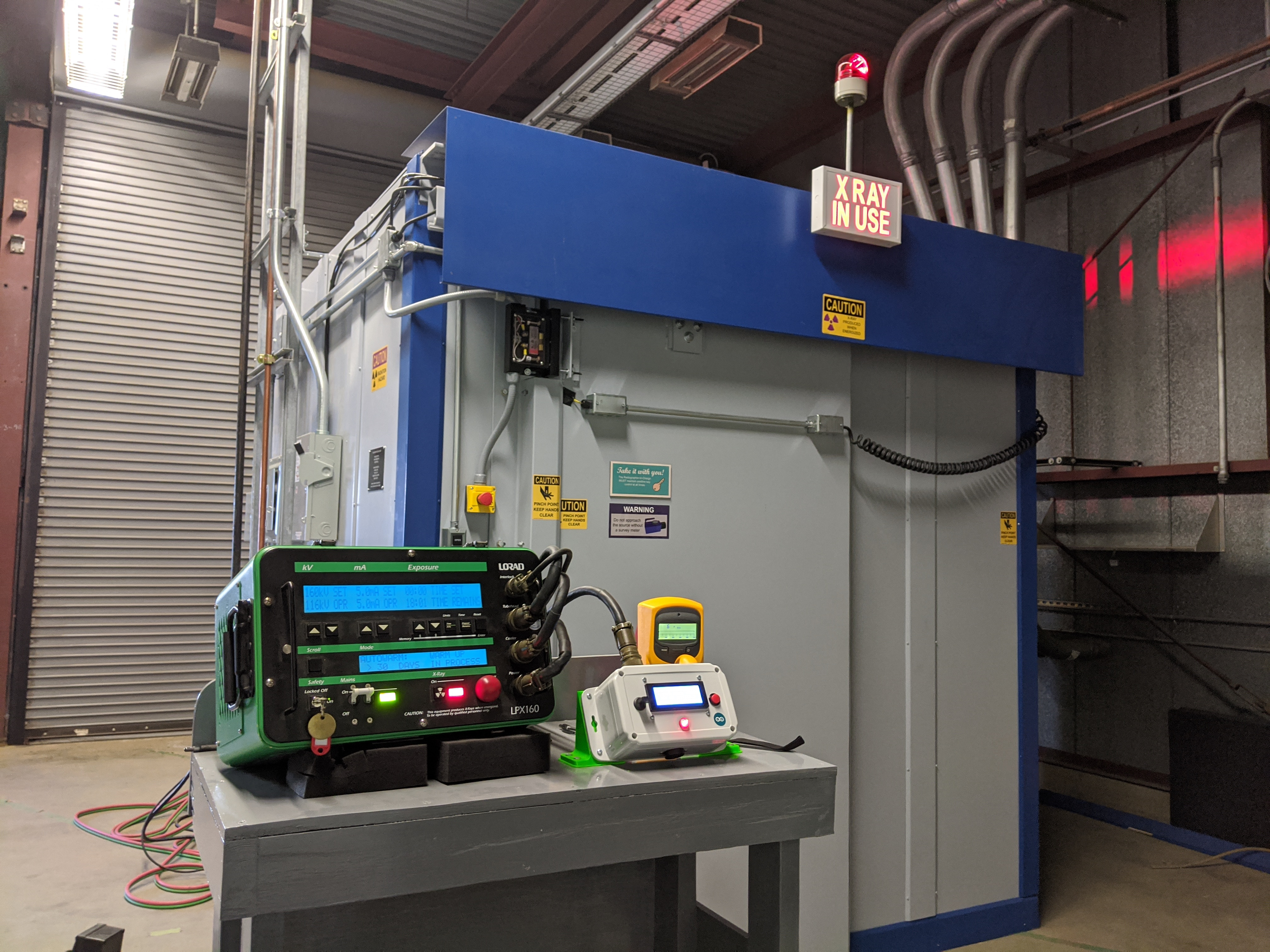
X-ray vault used in Radiography

Nondestructive testing (NDT) is any of a wide group of analysis techniques used in science and technology industry to evaluate the properties of a material, component or system without causing damage. The terms nondestructive examination (NDE), nondestructive inspection (NDI), and nondestructive evaluation (NDE) are also commonly used to describe this technology. Because NDT does not permanently alter the article being inspected, it is a highly valuable technique that can save both money and time in product evaluation, troubleshooting, and research. The six most frequently used NDT methods are eddy-current, magnetic-particle, liquid penetrant, radiographic, ultrasonic, and visual testing. NDT is commonly used in forensic engineering, mechanical engineering, petroleum engineering, electrical engineering, civil engineering, systems engineering, aeronautical engineering, medicine, and art. Innovations in the field of nondestructive testing have had a profound impact on medical imaging, including on echocardiography, medical ultrasonography, and digital radiography.

Non-Destructive Testing (NDT/ NDT testing) Techniques or Methodologies allow the investigator to carry out examinations without invading the integrity of the engineering specimen under observation while providing an elaborate view of the surface and structural discontinuities and obstructions. The personnel carrying out these methodologies require specialized NDT Training as they involve handling delicate equipment and subjective interpretation of the NDT inspection/NDT testing results.

NDT methods rely upon use of electromagnetic radiation, sound and other signal conversions to examine a wide variety of articles (metallic and non-metallic, food-product, artifacts and antiquities, infrastructure) for integrity, composition, or condition with no alteration of the article undergoing examination. Visual inspection (VT), the most commonly applied NDT method, is quite often enhanced by the use of magnification, borescopes, cameras, or other optical arrangements for direct or remote viewing. The internal structure of a sample can be examined for a volumetric inspection with penetrating radiation (RT), such as X-rays, neutrons or gamma radiation. Sound waves are utilized in the case of ultrasonic testing (UT), another volumetric NDT method – the mechanical signal (sound) being reflected by conditions in the test article and evaluated for amplitude and distance from the search unit (transducer). Another commonly used NDT method used on ferrous materials involves the application of fine iron particles (either suspended in liquid or dry powder – fluorescent or colored) that are applied to a part while it is magnetized, either continually or residually. The particles will be attracted to leakage fields of magnetism on or in the test object, and form indications (particle collection) on the object's surface, which are evaluated visually. Contrast and probability of detection for a visual examination by the unaided eye is often enhanced by using liquids to penetrate the test article surface, allowing for visualization of flaws or other surface conditions. This method (liquid penetrant testing) (PT) involves using dyes, fluorescent or colored (typically red), suspended in fluids and is used for non-magnetic materials, usually metals.

Analyzing and documenting a nondestructive failure mode can also be accomplished using a high-speed camera recording continuously (movie-loop) until the failure is detected. Detecting the failure can be accomplished using a sound detector or stress gauge which produces a signal to trigger the high-speed camera. These high-speed cameras have advanced recording modes to capture some non-destructive failures. After the failure the high-speed camera will stop recording. The captured images can be played back in slow motion showing precisely what happened before, during and after the nondestructive event, image by image.

== Applications ==
NDT is used in a variety of settings that covers a wide range of industrial activity, with new NDT methods and applications, being continuously developed. Nondestructive testing methods are routinely applied in industries where a failure of a component would cause significant hazard or economic loss, such as in transportation, pressure vessels, building structures, piping, and hoisting equipment.

=== Weld verification ===
1. Section of material with a surface-breaking crack that is not visible to the naked eye.; 2. Penetrant is applied to the surface.; 3. Excess penetrant is removed.; 4. Developer is applied, rendering the crack visible.

In manufacturing, welds are commonly used to join two or more metal parts. Because these connections may encounter loads and fatigue during product lifetime, there is a chance that they may fail if not created to proper specification. For example, the base metal must reach a certain temperature during the welding process, must cool at a specific rate, and must be welded with compatible materials or the joint may not be strong enough to hold the parts together, or cracks may form in the weld causing it to fail. The typical welding defects (lack of fusion of the weld to the base metal, cracks or porosity inside the weld, and variations in weld density) could cause a structure to break or a pipeline to rupture.

Welds may be tested using NDT techniques such as industrial radiography or industrial CT scanning using X-rays or gamma rays, ultrasonic testing, liquid penetrant testing, magnetic particle inspection or via eddy current. In a proper weld, these tests would indicate a lack of cracks in the radiograph, show clear passage of sound through the weld and back, or indicate a clear surface without penetrant captured in cracks.

Welding techniques may also be actively monitored with acoustic emission techniques before production to design the best set of parameters to use to properly join two materials. In the case of high stress or safety critical welds, weld monitoring will be employed to confirm the specified welding parameters (arc current, arc voltage, travel speed, heat input etc.) are being adhered to those stated in the welding procedure. This verifies the weld as correct to procedure prior to nondestructive evaluation and metallurgy tests.

=== Structural mechanics ===
Structure can be complex systems that undergo different loads during their lifetime, e.g. Lithium-ion batteries. Some complex structures, such as the turbo machinery in a liquid-fuel rocket, can also cost millions of dollars. Engineers will commonly model these structures as coupled second-order systems, approximating dynamic structure components with springs, masses, and dampers. The resulting sets of differential equations are then used to derives a transfer function that models the behavior of the system.

In NDT, the structure undergoes a dynamic input, such as the tap of a hammer or a controlled impulse. Key properties, such as displacement or acceleration at different points of the structure, are measured as the corresponding output. This output is recorded and compared to the corresponding output given by the transfer function and the known input. Differences may indicate an inappropriate model (which may alert engineers to unpredicted instabilities or performance outside of tolerances), failed components, or an inadequate control system.

Reference standards, which are structures that intentionally flawed in order to be compared with components intended for use in the field, are often used in NDT. Reference standards can be with many NDT techniques, such as UT, RT and VT.

=== Relation to medical procedures ===
Chest radiography indicating a peripheral bronchial carcinoma.

Several NDT methods are related to Clinical Procedures, such as radiography, ultrasonic testing, and visual testing. Technological improvements or upgrades in these NDT methods have migrated over from medical equipment advances, including digital radiography (DR), phased array ultrasonic testing (PAUT), and endoscopy (borescope or assisted visual inspection).

== Notable events in academic and industrial NDT ==
- 1854 Hartford, Connecticut – A boiler at the Fales and Gray Car works explodes, killing 21 people and seriously injuring 50. Within a decade, the State of Connecticut passes a law requiring annual inspection (in this case visual) of boilers.
- 1880–1920 – The "Oil and Whiting" method of crack detection is used in the railroad industry to find cracks in heavy steel parts. (A part is soaked in thinned oil, then painted with a white coating that dries to a powder. Oil seeping out from cracks turns the white powder brown, allowing the cracks to be detected.) This was the precursor to modern liquid penetrant tests.
- 1895 – Wilhelm Conrad Röntgen discovers what are now known as X-rays. In his first paper he discusses the possibility of flaw detection.
- 1920 – Dr. H. H. Lester begins development of industrial radiography for metals.
- 1924 – Lester uses radiography to examine castings to be installed in a Boston Edison Company steam pressure power plant.
- 1926 – The first electromagnetic eddy current instrument is available to measure material thicknesses.
- 1927-1928 – Magnetic induction system to detect flaws in railroad track developed by Dr. Elmer Sperry and H.C. Drake.
- 1929 – Magnetic particle methods and equipment pioneered (A.V. DeForest and F.B. Doane.)
- 1930s – Robert F. Mehl demonstrates radiographic imaging using gamma radiation from Radium, which can examine thicker components than the low-energy X-ray machines available at the time.
- 1935–1940 – Liquid penetrant tests developed (Betz, Doane, and DeForest)
- 1935–1940s – Eddy current instruments developed (H.C. Knerr, C. Farrow, Theo Zuschlag, and Fr. F. Foerster).
- 1940–1944 – Ultrasonic test method developed in USA by Dr. Floyd Firestone, who applies for a U.S. invention patent for same on May 27, 1940, and is issued the U.S. patent as grant no. 2,280,226 on April 21, 1942. Extracts from the first two paragraphs of this seminal patent for a nondestructive testing method succinctly describe the basics of ultrasonic testing. "My invention pertains to a device for detecting the presence of inhomogeneities of density or elasticity in materials. For instance if a casting has a hole or a crack within it, my device allows the presence of the flaw to be detected and its position located, even though the flaw lies entirely within the casting and no portion of it extends out to the surface." Additionally, "The general principle of my device consists of sending high frequency vibrations into the part to be inspected, and the determination of the time intervals of arrival of the direct and reflected vibrations at one or more stations on the surface of the part." Medical echocardiography is an offshoot of this technology.
- 1946 – First neutron radiographs produced by Peters.
- 1950 – The Schmidt Hammer (also known as "Swiss Hammer") is invented. The instrument uses the world's first patented non-destructive testing method for concrete.
- 1950 – J. Kaiser introduces acoustic emission as an NDT method.

(Basic source for above: Hellier, 2001) Note the number of advancements made during the WWII era, a time when industrial quality control was growing in importance.

- 1955 – ICNDT founded. World organizing body for Nondestructive Testing.
- 1955 – First NDT World Conference takes place in Brussels, organized by ICNDT. NDT World Conference takes place every four years.
- 1963 – Frederick G. Weighart's and James F. McNulty (U.S. radio engineer)'s co-invention of Digital radiography is an offshoot of the pairs development of nondestructive test equipment at Automation Industries, Inc., then, in El Segundo, California. See James F. McNulty also at article Ultrasonic testing.
- 1996 – Rolf Diederichs founded the first Open Access NDT Journal in the Internet. Today the Open Access NDT Database NDT.net
- 1998 – The European Federation for Non-Destructive Testing (EFNDT) was founded in May 1998 in Copenhagen at the 7th European Conference for Non-Destructive Testing (ECNDT). 27 national European NDT societies joined the powerful organization.
- 2008 – NDT in Aerospace Conference was established, DGZfP and Fraunhofer IIS hosted the first international congress in Bavaria, Germany.
- 2008 – Academia NDT International has been officially founded and has its base office in Brescia (Italy) www.academia-ndt.org
- 2012 – ISO Qualification and Certification of NDT Personnel
- 2020 – Accreditation Certification from NABCB for Qualification and Certification of NDT Personnel as per ISO 9712:2012

== ISO 9712 ==
This ISO 9712 requirements for principles for the qualification and certification of personnel who perform industrial non-destructive testing(NDT).

The system specified in this International Standard can also apply to other NDT methods or to new techniques within an established NDT method, provided a comprehensive scheme of certification exists and the method or technique is covered by International, regional or national standards or the new NDT method or technique has been demonstrated to be effective to the satisfaction of the certification body.

The certification covers proficiency in one or more of the following methods: a) acoustic emission testing; b) eddy current testing; c) infrared thermographic testing; d) leak testing (hydraulic pressure tests excluded); e) magnetic testing; f) penetrant testing; g) radiographic testing; h) strain gauge testing; i) ultrasonic testing; j) visual testing (direct unaided visual tests and visual tests carried out during the application of another NDT method are excluded).

== Methods and techniques ==
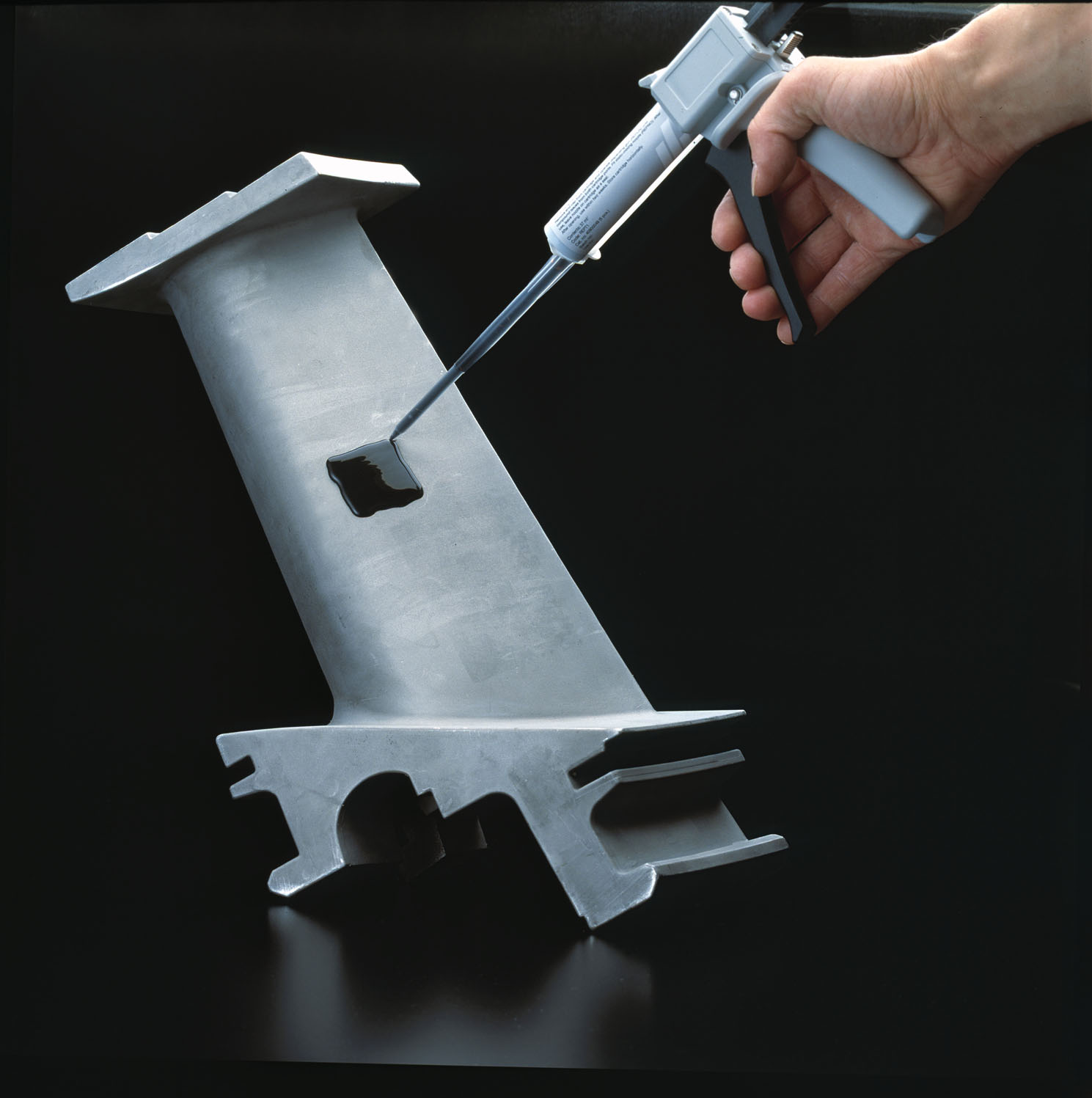
An example of a 3D replicating technique. The flexible high-resolution replicas allow surfaces to be examined and measured under laboratory conditions. A replica can be taken from all solid materials.

NDT is divided into various methods of nondestructive testing, each based on a particular scientific principle. These methods may be further subdivided into various techniques. The various methods and techniques, due to their particular natures, may lend themselves especially well to certain applications and be of little or no value at all in other applications. Therefore, choosing the right method and technique is an important part of the performance of NDT.

- Acoustic emission testing (AE or AT)
- Acoustic microscopy
- Blue etch anodize (BEA)
- Dye penetrant inspection or liquid penetrant testing (PT or LPI)
- Electromagnetic testing (ET) or electromagnetic inspection (commonly known as "EMI")
  - Alternating current field measurement (ACFM)
  - Alternating current potential drop measurement (ACPD)
  - Barkhausen testing
  - Direct current potential drop measurement (DCPD)
  - Eddy-current testing (ECT)
  - Magnetic flux leakage testing (MFL) for pipelines, tank floors, and wire rope
  - Magnetic flux leakage prestressed steel testing for prestressed steel
  - Magnetic-particle inspection (MT or MPI)
  - Magnetovision
  - Remote field testing (RFT)
- Ellipsometry
- Endoscope inspection
- Guided wave testing (GWT)
- Hardness testing
- Impulse excitation technique (IET)
- Microwave imaging
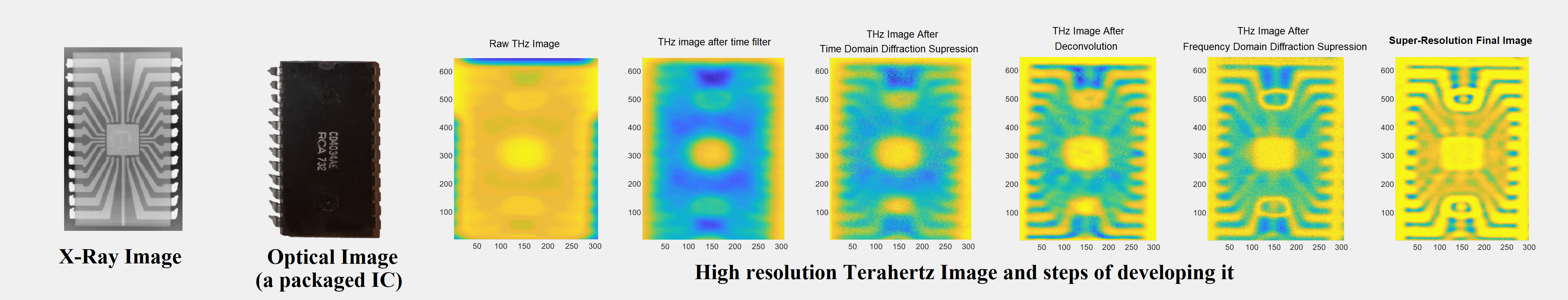
- X-Ray, Optical and Terahertz image of a packaged IC.
  Terahertz nondestructive evaluation (THz)
- Infrared and thermal testing (IR)
  - Thermographic inspection
  - Scanning thermal microscopy
- Laser testing
  - Electronic speckle pattern interferometry
  - Holographic interferometry
  - Self-mixing laser interferometry
  - Low coherence interferometry
  - Optical coherence tomography (OCT)
  - Profilometry
  - Shearography
- Leak testing (LT) or Leak detection
  - Hydrostatic test
  - Absolute pressure leak testing (pressure change)
  - Bubble testing
  - Halogen diode leak testing
  - Hydrogen leak testing
  - Mass spectrometer leak testing
  - Tracer-gas leak testing method for helium, hydrogen and refrigerant gases
- Machine vision based automatic inspection
- Magnetic resonance imaging (MRI) and NMR spectroscopy
- Metallographic replicas
- Spectroscopy
  - Near-infrared spectroscopy (NIRS)
  - Mid-infrared spectroscopy (MIR)
  - (Far-infrared =) Terahertz spectroscopy
  - Raman Spectroscopy
  - Positron annihilation spectroscopy
- Optical microscopy
- Positive material identification (PMI)
- Radiographic testing (RT) (see also Industrial radiography and Radiography)
  - Computed radiography
  - Digital radiography (real-time)
  - Neutron imaging
  - SCAR (small controlled area radiography)
  - X-ray computed tomography (CT)
- Resonant inspection
  - Resonant acoustic method (RAM)
- Scanning electron microscopy
- Surface temper etch (Nital Etch)
- Ultrasonic testing (UT)
  - Acoustic resonance technology (ART)
  - Angle beam testing
  - Electromagnetic acoustic transducer (EMAT) (non-contact)
  - Laser ultrasonics (LUT)
  - Internal rotary inspection system (IRIS) ultrasonics for tubes
  - Phased array ultrasonics (PAUT)
  - Thickness measurement
  - Time of flight diffraction ultrasonics (TOFD)
  - Time-of-flight ultrasonic determination of 3D elastic constants (TOF)
- Vibration analysis
- Visual inspection (VT)
  - Pipeline video inspection
- Weight and load testing of structures
- Corroscan/C-scan
- 3D computed tomography
  - Industrial CT scanning
- Heat Exchanger Life Assessment System
- RTJ Flange Special Ultrasonic Testing

== Personnel training, qualification and certification ==
Successful and consistent application of nondestructive testing techniques depends heavily on personnel training, experience and integrity. Personnel involved in application of industrial NDT methods and interpretation of results should be certified, and in some industrial sectors certification is enforced by law or by the applied codes and standards.

NDT professionals and managers can join NDTMA, a member organization of NDT Managers and Executives who work to provide a forum for the open exchange of managerial, technical and regulatory information. Their annual conference is at the Golden Nugget in Las Vegas.

=== Certification schemes ===
There are two approaches in personnel certification:

1. Employer Based Certification: Under this concept the employer compiles their own Written Practice. The written practice defines the responsibilities of each level of certification, as implemented by the company, and describes the training, experience and examination requirements for each level of certification. In industrial sectors the written practices are usually based on recommended practice SNT-TC-1A of the American Society for Nondestructive Testing. ANSI standard CP-189 outlines requirements for any written practice that conforms to the standard. For aviation, space, and defense (ASD) applications NAS 410 sets further requirements for NDT personnel, and is published by AIA – Aerospace Industries Association, which is made up of US aerospace airframe and powerplant manufacturers. This is the basis document for EN 4179 and other (USA) NIST-recognized aerospace standards for the Qualification and Certification (employer-based) of Nondestructive Testing personnel. NAS 410 also sets the requirements also for "National NDT Boards", which allow and proscribe personal certification schemes. NAS 410 allows ASNT Certification as a portion of the qualifications needed for ASD certification.
2. Personal Central Certification: The concept of central certification is that an NDT operator can obtain certification from a central certification authority, that is recognized by most employers, third parties and/or government authorities. Industrial standards for central certification schemes include ISO 9712, and ANSI/ASNT CP-106 (used for the ASNT ACCP scheme). Certification under these standards involves training, work experience under supervision and passing a written and practical examination set up by the independent certification authority. EN 473 was another central certification scheme, very similar to ISO 9712, which was withdrawn when CEN replaced it with EN ISO 9712 in 2012.

In the United States employer based schemes are the norm, however central certification schemes exist as well. The most notable is ASNT Level III (established in 1976–1977), which is organized by the American Society for Nondestructive Testing for Level 3 NDT personnel. NAVSEA 250-1500 is another US central certification scheme, specifically developed for use in the naval nuclear program.

Central certification is more widely used in the European Union, where certifications are issued by accredited bodies (independent organizations conforming to ISO 17024 and accredited by a national accreditation authority like UKAS). The Pressure Equipment Directive (97/23/EC) actually enforces central personnel certification for the initial testing of steam boilers and some categories of pressure vessels and piping. European Standards harmonized with this directive specify personnel certification to EN 473. Certifications issued by a national NDT society which is a member of the European Federation of NDT (EFNDT) are mutually acceptable by the other member societies under a multilateral recognition agreement.

Canada also implements an ISO 9712 central certification scheme, which is administered by Natural Resources Canada, a government department.

The aerospace sector worldwide sticks to employer based schemes. In America it is based mostly on the Aerospace Industries Association's (AIA) AIA-NAS-410 and in the European Union on the equivalent and very similar standard EN 4179. However EN 4179:2009 includes an option for central qualification and certification by a National aerospace NDT board or NANDTB (paragraph 4.5.2).

=== Levels of certification ===
Most NDT personnel certification schemes listed above specify three "levels" of qualification and/or certification, usually designated as Level 1, Level 2 and Level 3 (although some codes specify Roman numerals, like Level II). The roles and responsibilities of personnel in each level are generally as follows (there are slight differences or variations between different codes and standards):

- Level 1 are technicians qualified to perform only specific calibrations and tests under close supervision and direction by higher level personnel. They can only report test results. Normally they work following specific work instructions for testing procedures and rejection criteria.
- Level 2 are engineers or experienced technicians who are able to set up and calibrate testing equipment, conduct the inspection according to codes and standards (instead of following work instructions) and compile work instructions for Level 1 technicians. They are also authorized to report, interpret, evaluate and document testing results. They can also supervise and train Level 1 technicians. In addition to testing methods, they must be familiar with applicable codes and standards and have some knowledge of the manufacture and service of tested products.
- Level 3 are usually specialized engineers or very experienced technicians. They can establish NDT techniques and procedures and interpret codes and standards. They also direct NDT laboratories and have central role in personnel certification. They are expected to have wider knowledge covering materials, fabrication and product technology.

== Terminology ==
The standard US terminology for Nondestructive testing is defined in standard ASTM E-1316. Some definitions may be different in European standard EN 1330.

Indication
The response or evidence from an examination, such as a blip on the screen of an instrument. Indications are classified as true or false. False indications are those caused by factors not related to the principles of the testing method or by improper implementation of the method, like film damage in radiography, electrical interference in ultrasonic testing etc. True indications are further classified as relevant and non relevant. Relevant indications are those caused by flaws. Non relevant indications are those caused by known features of the tested object, like gaps, threads, case hardening etc.
Interpretation
Determining if an indication is of a type to be investigated. For example, in electromagnetic testing, indications from metal loss are considered flaws because they should usually be investigated, but indications due to variations in the material properties may be harmless and nonrelevant.
Flaw
A type of discontinuity that must be investigated to see if it is rejectable. For example, porosity in a weld or metal loss.
Evaluation
Determining if a flaw is rejectable. For example, is porosity in a weld larger than acceptable by code?
Defect
A flaw that is rejectable – i.e. does not meet acceptance criteria. Defects are generally removed or repaired.

== Reliability and statistics ==
Probability of detection (POD) tests are a standard way to evaluate a nondestructive testing technique in a given set of circumstances, for example "What is the POD of lack of fusion flaws in pipe welds using manual ultrasonic testing?" The POD will usually increase with flaw size. A common error in POD tests is to assume that the percentage of flaws detected is the POD, whereas the percentage of flaws detected is merely the first step in the analysis. Since the number of flaws tested is necessarily a limited number (non-infinite), statistical methods must be used to determine the POD for all possible defects, beyond the limited number tested. Another common error in POD tests is to define the statistical sampling units (test items) as flaws, whereas a true sampling unit is an item that may or may not contain a flaw. Guidelines for correct application of statistical methods to POD tests can be found in ASTM E2862 Standard Practice for Probability of Detection Analysis for Hit/Miss Data and MIL-HDBK-1823A Nondestructive Evaluation System Reliability Assessment, from the U.S. Department of Defense Handbook.

== See also ==
- Destructive testing – Test involving a specimen's destruction
- Failure analysis – Process of collecting and analyzing data to determine the cause of a failure
- Forensic engineering – Investigation of failures associated with legal intervention
- Inspection – Organized examination or formal evaluation exercise
- Magnetovision – Visualization technique
- Maintenance testing – Identify equipment problems through routine testing
- Materials science – Research of materials
- Nondestructive Evaluation 4.0 – Concept of industrial testing and evaluation for the digital age
- Predictive maintenance – Method to predict when equipment should be maintained
- Product certification – Performance and quality assurance
- Quality control – Processes that maintain quality at a constant level
- Reliability engineering – Sub-discipline of systems engineering that emphasizes dependability
- Risk-based inspection – Optimal maintenance process in industrial plants
- Robotic non-destructive testing – Method of inspection using remotely operated tools
- Stress testing – Class of tests going beyond standard operation conditions
- Terahertz nondestructive evaluation – Imaging and evaluation using the terahertz domain of electromagnetic radiation
- Thermal acoustic imaging – Nondestructive testing method
