= Time-of-flight ultrasonic determination of 3D elastic constants =

The three-dimensional elastic constants of materials can be measured using the ultrasonic immersion method. This was pioneered by Zimmer and Cost from the National Physical Laboratory in the 1960s. It has mainly been used for polymer composite materials. Knowledge of the elastic constants can be used to feed back into models of the material's behaviour or that of the composite manufacturing process used.

== Immersion technique ==
The ultrasonic immersion method makes use of a temperature stabilised water bath which has a pair of ultrasonic transducers located on either side of the sample which can be rotated using a stepper motor.

The time of flight of an ultrasonic pulse that has been transmitted through the material is measured using an electronic timer that determines the start of the transmitted pulse and the start of the received pulse using threshold detection. This timer is typically accurate to microsecond or better resolution.

By rotating the sample, time of flight measurements can be obtained a range of angles of incidence, typically up to 40 degrees. From the time of flight, the phase velocity can be determined as a function of the angle of incidence of the ultrasonic pulse.

Using Christoffel's equations, the measured data can be fitted using a least squares numeric method to determine six of the nine elastic constants.

By slicing the composite material and re-arranging the slices, the method can be re-applied to obtain the remaining three constants not found from the original measurements.
