= Magnetic flux leakage =

Non-destructive testing method

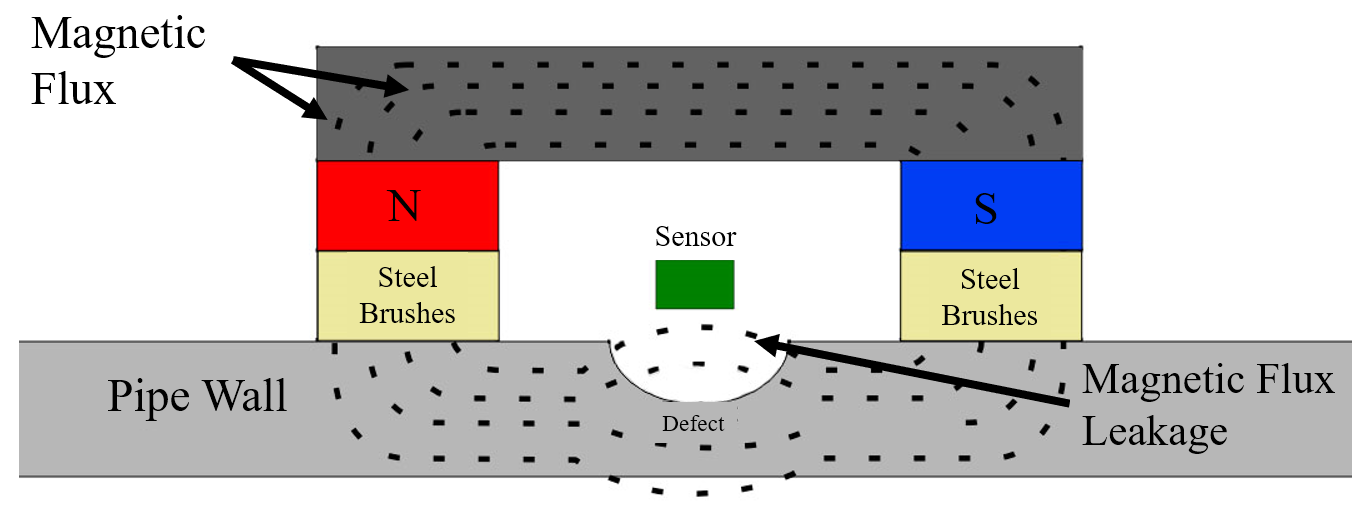
Magnetic Flux Leakage Principle

Magnetic flux leakage (also known as Transverse Field Inspection technology, or TFI) is a magnetic method of nondestructive testing to detect corrosion and pitting in steel structures, for instance: pipelines and storage tanks. The basic principle is that the magnetic field "leaks" from the steel at areas where there is corrosion or missing metal. To magnetize the steel, a powerful magnet is used. In a Magnetic Flux Leakage (MFL) tool, a magnetic detector is placed between the poles of the magnet to detect the leakage field. Analysts interpret the chart recording of the leakage field to identify damaged areas and to estimate the depth of metal loss.

== Introduction to pipeline examination ==
There are many methods of assessing the integrity of a pipeline. In-line-Inspection (ILI) tools are built to travel inside a pipeline and collect data as they go. Magnetic Flux Leakage inline inspection tool (MFL-ILI) has been in use the longest for pipeline inspection. MFL-ILIs detect and assess areas where the pipe wall may be damaged by corrosion. The more advanced versions are referred to as "high-resolution" due to their increased number of sensors. The high-resolution MFL-ILIs allow more reliable and accurate identification of anomalies in a pipeline, thus, minimizing the need for expensive verification excavations. Accurate assessment of pipeline anomalies can improve the decision making process within an Integrity Management Program and excavation programs can then focus on required repairs instead of calibration or exploratory digs. Utilizing the information from an MFL ILI inspection is not only cost effective but can also prove to be an extremely valuable building block of a Pipeline Integrity Management Program.

The reliable supply and transportation of product in a safe and cost-effective manner is a primary goal of most pipeline operating companies; managing the integrity of the pipeline is paramount in maintaining this objective. In-line-inspection programs are one of the most effective means of obtaining data that can be used as a fundamental base for an Integrity Management Program. There are many types of ILI tools that detect various pipeline defects. However, high-resolution MFL tools are becoming increasingly prevalent as its applications are surpassing those to which it was originally designed. Originally designed for detecting areas of metal loss, the modern High Resolution MFL tool is proving to be able to accurately assess the severity of corrosion features, define dents, wrinkles, buckles, and cracks.

== MFL pipeline inspection tools ==
=== Background and origin of the term "pig" ===
In the field, a device that travels inside a pipeline to clean or inspect it is typically known as a pig. PIG is a bacronym for "Pipeline Inspection Gauge". The acronym PIG came later as the nickname for "pig" originated from cleaning pigs (first designed pigs) that sounded like squealing or screeching pigs when they passed through the lines to clean them using methods such as scraping, scrubbing and "squeegeeing" the internal surface. The name serves as common industry jargon for all pigs, both intelligent tools and cleaning tools. Pigs, in order to fit inside the pipeline, are cylindrical and are necessarily short in order to be able to negotiate bends in the pipeline. Many other short, cylindrical objects, such as propane storage tanks, are also known as pigs and it is likely that the name came from the shape of the devices.

In some countries, a pig is known as a "Diablo", literally translated to mean "the Devil" relating to the shuddering sound the tool would make as it passed beneath people's feet. The pigs are built to match the diameter of a pipeline and use the very product being carried to end users to transport them. Pigs have been used in pipelines for many years and have many uses. Some separate one product from another, some clean and some inspect. An MFL tool is known as an "intelligent" or "smart" inspection pig because it contains electronics and collects data real-time while traveling through the pipeline. Sophisticated electronics on board allow this tool to accurately detect anomalies as small as 1 mm^{2}, which can include dimensions of a pipeline wall as well as its depth and thickness. This is crucial in identifying potential wall loss.

Typically, an MFL tool consists of two or more bodies. One body is the magnetizer with the magnets and sensors and the other bodies contain the electronics and batteries. The magnetizer body houses the sensors that are located between powerful "rare-earth" magnets. The magnets are mounted between the brushes and tool body to create a magnetic circuit along the pipe wall. As the tool travels along the pipe, the sensors detect interruptions in the magnetic circuit. Interruptions are typically caused by metal loss, which is typically caused by corrosion and is denoted as a "feature". Other features may be manufacturing defects or physical gouges. The feature indication or "reading" includes its length by width by depth as well as the o'clock position of the anomaly/feature. The metal loss in a magnetic circuit is analogous to a rock in a stream. Magnetism needs metal to flow and in the absence of it, the flow of magnetism will go around, over or under to maintain its relative path from one magnet to another, similar to the flow of water around a rock in a stream. The sensors detect the changes in the magnetic field in the three directions (axial, radial, or circumferential) to characterize the anomaly. The sensors are typically oriented axially which limits data to axial conditions along the length of the pipeline. Other designs of smart pigs can address other directional data readings or have completely different functions than that of a standard MFL tool. Oftentimes an operator will run a series of inspection tools to help verify or confirm MFL readings and vice versa. An MFL tool can take sensor readings based on either the distance the tool travels or on increments of time. The choice depends on many factors such as the length of the run, the speed that the tool intends to travel, and the number of stops or outages that the tool may experience.

The second body is called an Electronics Can. This section can be split into a number of bodies depending on the size of the tool, and contains the electronics required for the PIG to function. It contains the batteries and is some cases an IMU (Inertial Measurement Unit) to tie location information to GPS coordinates. On the very rear of the tool are odometer wheels that travel along the inside of the pipeline to measure the distance and speed of the tool.

== MFL principle ==
As a MFL tool navigates the pipeline a magnetic circuit is created between the pipewall and the tool. Brushes typically act as a transmitter of magnetic flux from the tool into the pipewall, and as the magnets are oriented in opposing directions, a flow of flux is created in an elliptical pattern. High Field MFL tools saturate the pipewall with magnetic flux until the pipewall can no longer hold any more flux. The remaining flux leaks out of the pipewall and strategically placed tri-axial Hall effect sensor heads can accurately measure the three-dimensional vector of the leakage field.

Given the fact that magnetic flux leakage is a vector quantity and that a hall sensor can only measure in one direction, three sensors must be oriented within a sensor head to accurately measure the axial, radial and circumferential components of an MFL signal. The axial component of the vector signal is measured by a sensor mounted orthogonal to the axis of the pipe, and the radial sensor is mounted to measure the strength of the flux that leaks out of the pipe. The circumferential component of the vector signal can be measured by mounting a sensor perpendicular to this field. Earlier MFL tools recorded only the axial component but high-resolution tools typically measure all three components. To determine if metal loss is occurring on the internal or external surface of a pipe, a separate eddy current sensor is utilized to indicate wall surface location of the anomaly. The unit of measure when sensing an MFL signal is the gauss or the tesla and generally speaking, the larger the change in the detected magnetic field, the larger the anomaly.

== Signal analysis ==
The primary purpose of a MFL tool is to detect corrosion in a pipeline. To more accurately predict the dimensions (length, width and depth) of a corrosion feature, extensive testing is performed before the tool enters an operational pipeline. Using a known collection of measured defects, tools can be trained and tested to accurately interpret MFL signals. Defects can be simulated using a variety of methods.

Creating and therefore knowing the actual dimensions of a feature makes it relatively easy to make simple correlations of signals to actual anomalies found in a pipeline. When signals in an actual pipeline inspection have similar characteristics to the signals found during testing it is logical to assume that the features would be similar. The algorithms and neural nets designed for calculating the dimensions of a corrosion feature are complicated and often they are closely guarded trade secrets. An anomaly is often reported in a simplified fashion as a cubic feature with an estimated length, width and depth. In this way, the effective area of metal loss can be calculated and used in acknowledged formulas to predict the estimated burst pressure of the pipe due to the detected anomaly.

Another important factor in the ongoing improvement of sizing algorithms is customer feedback to the ILI vendors. Every anomaly in a pipeline is unique and it is impossible to replicate in the shop what exists in all cases in the field. Open lines of communication usually exist between the inspection companies and the pipeline operators as to what was reported and what was actually visually observed in an excavation.

After an inspection, the collected data is downloaded and compiled so that an analyst is able to accurately interpret the collected signals. Most pipeline inspection companies have proprietary software designed to view their own tool's collected data. The three components of the MFL vector field are viewed independently and collectively to identify and classify corrosion features. Metal loss features have unique signals that analysts are trained to identify.

=== Estimation of corrosion growth rate ===
High-resolution MFL tools collect data approximately every 2 mm along the axis of a pipe and this superior resolution allows for a comprehensive analysis of collected signals. Pipeline Integrity Management programs have specific intervals for inspecting pipeline segments and by employing high-resolution MFL tools an exceptional corrosion growth analysis can be conducted. This type of analysis proves extremely useful in forecasting the inspection intervals.

=== Other features that an MFL tool can identify ===
Although primarily used to detect corrosion, MFL tools can also be used to detect features that they were not originally designed to identify. When an MFL tool encounters a geometric deformity such as a dent, wrinkle or buckle, a very distinct signal is created due to the plastic deformation of the pipe wall.

=== Crack detection ===
There are cases where large non-axial oriented cracks have been found in a pipeline that was inspected by a magnetic flux leakage tool. To an experienced MFL data analyst, a dent is easily recognizable by trademark "horseshoe" signal in the radial component of the vector field. What is not easily identifiable to an MFL tool is the signature that a crack leaves.
