= Plastic weld non-destructive examination =

Testing method for plastic welds

A variety of non-destructive examination (NDE) techniques are available for inspecting plastic welds. Many of these techniques are similar to the ones used for inspecting metal welds. Traditional techniques include visual testing, radiography, and various ultrasonic techniques. Advanced ultrasonic techniques such as time of flight diffraction (TOFD) and phased-array ultrasonics (PAUT) are being increasingly studied and used for inspecting plastic pipeline welds. Research in the use of optical coherence tomography (OCT) and microwave reflectrometry has also been conducted.

The main purpose of NDE is to detect defects in the weld and the joint fit-up. Examples include joint mismatch, cracks, porosity, voids, inclusions, lack of penetration and lack of fusion (cold joints). However, the lack of defects does not necessarily mean the weld is adequate and thus NDE does not provide a good indication of weld strength, long term performance, or its ability to handle cyclic loading. Although destructive testing gives a better indication of actual joint strength, it's impractical to use on production welds since the sample is destroyed. Hence, the need to use and develop NDE techniques to ensure sound welds are being produced during production welding.

== Visual Testing (VT) ==
Visual testing is one of the most basic and inexpensive methods. It consists of a technician visually observing the joint and comparing it to a set of acceptance criteria based on code of construction. Its use is mainly limited to joint fit-up and detecting surface breaking flaws. It can be done as an in-process inspection, while the welding is occurring, or on the completed weld. In-process inspections can show problems with the weld such as discoloration, indicating thermal degradation, bubbles, scratches, and weld bead problems. Visual inspection of the completed weld can detect joint fit-up and tool problems such as mismatch, angular misalignment, notches, and insufficient weld size as well as surface breaking weld defects like porosity, cracks, and excessive flash. As with most NDE techniques, technical training, experience, and skill is important for a successful inspection.

== Leak Testing ==
Leak testing is commonly used for piping and pressure vessels due to the safety, reliability, or environment consequences of a leak once in service. The part to be tested is filled with water, air, or other type of fluid. Depending on the application, testing can be done at atmospheric pressure, under a positive pressure, or under vacuum. Evidence of leak can either be visual or by observing a change in pressure. When positive pressure is used, testing with non-compressible fluids is safer than using a gas. Gasses under pressure contain a significantly higher amount of stored energy than liquids and a rupture can pose a significant safety risk.

== Radiography (RT) ==
Radiography uses an X-ray tube or radioactive source to give an image of the weld. Its use is similar to metal welds and provides a volumetric inspection which can show defects in the weld not visible from the surface. For plastics, a lower radiation intensity is typically required than that for metal welds, due to the lower material density. Because of the higher cost, it's typically only used in critical applications like pipelines and not for commercial products.

== Ultrasonic Inspection ==
Various forms of ultrasonic inspection are used for plastic welds. Plastics have higher attenuation and a lower sound velocity compared to metals which can make these techniques more challenging. In 2010, a joint European project, TestPEP, was started to develop and validate ultrasonic NDE techniques on plastic welded pipe. The use of plastic pipe is limited in safety critical applications due to the lack of accepted NDE techniques and acceptance criteria. For butt welded plastic pipe, TestPEP proposed the use three different ultrasonic techniques. TOFD with PAUT probes to inspect the majority of the weld, traditional PAUT to look for flaws in the middle of the fusion zone, and a creeping wave to inspect the top of the weld.

=== Inspection of polyethylene pipe in nuclear power plants ===
One area that has driven research on NDE of plastic welds is the use of High-density polyethylene (HDPE) in nuclear power plants. Metal piping has traditionally been used for cooling water piping; however, HDPE offers significant advantages due to its significantly longer service life and its strength to weight ratio. ASME Code Case N-755 covers the use of HDPE in Class 3 safety related piping; however it has not been endorsed by the US Nuclear Regulatory Commission (NRC). One of the concerns is that although N-755 requires that NDE be conducted on pipe welds, it does not specify the method or acceptance criteria. In 2009, the NRC began to allow the use of HDPE in safety related applications, but on a case by case basis with NRC approval.

In 2008, the Pacific Northwest National Laboratory published a report based on a project sponsored by the NCR to study NDE techniques for HDPE welds.

== Microwave Reflectometry ==
Research in the use of Microwaves (electromagnetic radiation in the frequency range of 300 MHz to 300 GHz) has been conducted on HDPE piping to inspect the fusion welds as well as to scan the pipe wall via an internal crawler to find defects (similar to pipeline pigging). Microwave reflectometry works similar to ultrasonic inspection techniques in that the microwaves are reflected back towards the source (backscattered) as they pass through materials with different permittivity or encounter defects such as voids and cracks.

Zhu et al. experimented with the use of a 21.6 GHz probe to scan the fusion butt welds of HDPE pipe. They compared a reference scan of a good weld with scans of welds with lack of fusion and cold welds. These types of weld defects can be difficult to detect since they don't necessarily result in laminations that would strongly reflect a signal. The defective welds were made by adding various delay times between the end of heating and start of fusion as well as welding with low temperature and pressure. In the scan images, the good weld appeared as a uniform line. The defective welds exhibited various discontinuities and a non-uniform appearance. Mechanical testing of the welds showed a marked decrease in properties, with reductions in the yield stress of one-third to one-half the value of the good weld. Their research did not include the development of quantitative acceptance criteria which would be needed for use in production applications.

Carrigan et al. used a pipe crawler operating in the K-band frequency range (18-16.5 GHz) to inspect HDPE pipe for various defects that would be commonly found in buried and undersea pipelines. Three types of set-ups were used to model the conditions of above ground pipelines, plastic lined metal pipe, and undersea pipelines. Defects were modeled using notches and holes in the outside of the pipe. The crawler was design with the microwave probes on a rotating head and sensors on the wheels to measure travel distance of the crawler. They were able to identify 1mm wide and 1mm deep defects on a 9.8 mm thick pipe wall for the above ground and undersea set-ups. However, they were unable to identify small defects in the plastic lined metal pipe due to the strong reflection from the metal. They also found that the probe frequency, standoff distance from the pipe wall, and orientation of the probe played a significant role in the ability to identify defects.

== Optical Coherence Tomography (OCT) ==
OCT has traditionally been used in the medical field but has found increased use in industrial NDE applications. K. Kim et al. studied its ability to identify weld defects in laser welding polycarbonate to acrylonitrile butadiene styrene copolymer. They used the maximum laser intensity of the system (10 times that required) in order to obtain a perfectly welded region and an imperfectively welded region. During laser welding, air bubbles can form and cause a degradation in the mechanical properties of the joint. Current inspection techniques are limited to finding air bubbles on the surface of the weld (optical and scanning electron microscopy). Destructive testing is usually required to find volumetric flaws. A 840-nm SD-OCT system with a broad band laser was used to scan the laser weld between the two samples. 800 A-scans were used to create a 2D image and 1000 images were put together to make the final 3D image. By looking at the border region between the perfect and imperfect weld, they were able to evaluate the effectiveness of OCT in finding weld defects. Air bubbles were visually apparent in the imperfectly welded region. The cross section of the 3D always showed a distinct difference between the perfectly welded region and the border region and the gap between sample in the non-welded region could easily be seen. By slicing the 3D image in different planes, additional quality information was obtained on the size and distribution of the various flaws. Since this in an optical inspection technique, its use is limited in materials that allow laser light to be transmitted through it.
