= Ultrasonic thickness measurement =

In the field of industrial ultrasonic testing, ultrasonic thickness measurement (UTM) is a method of performing non-destructive measurement (gauging) of the local thickness of a solid element (typically made of metal, if using ultrasound testing for industrial purposes) based on the time taken by the ultrasound wave to return to the surface. This type of measurement is typically performed with an ultrasonic thickness gauge.

Ultrasonic waves have been observed to travel through metals at a constant speed characteristic to a given alloy with minor variations due to other factors like temperature. Thus, given this information, called celerity, one can calculate the length of the path traversed by the wave using this formula:

$l_m = c t / 2$
where
$l_m$ is the thickness of the sample
$c$ is the velocity of sound in the given sample
$t$ is the traverse time

The formula features division by two because usually the instrumentation emits and records the ultrasound wave on the same side of the sample using the fact that it is reflected on the boundary of the element. Thus, the time corresponds to traversing the sample twice.

The wave is usually emitted by a piezoelectric cell or EMAT sensor that is built into the measurement sensor head and the same sensor is used to record the reflected wave. The sound wave has a spherical pattern of propagation and will undergo different phenomena like multipath reflection or diffraction. The measurement does not need to be affected by these since the first recorded return will normally be the head of the emitted wave traveling at the shortest distance which is equivalent to the thickness of the sample. All other returns can be discarded or might be processed using more complicated strategies.

== Thickness gauge ==
An ultrasonic thickness gauge is a measuring instrument for the non-destructive investigation of a material's thickness using ultrasonic waves.

The usage of an ultrasonic thickness gauge for non-destructive testing to check material properties such as thickness measurement, is regular in all areas of industrial measurements. The ability to gauge thickness measurement without requiring access to both sides of the test piece, offers this technology a multitude of possible applications. Paint thickness gauges, ultrasonic coating thickness gauges, digital thickness gauges and many more options are available to test plastics, glass, ceramics, metal and other materials. Along with coating thickness, it is widely being used for thicknesses of glass, wood, and plastics and also serves as major testing equipment in the corrosion industry.

A rugged ultrasonic thickness gauge determines sample thickness by measuring the amount of time it takes for sound to traverse from the transducer through the material to the back end of a part and back. The ultrasonic thickness gauge then calculates the data based on the speed of the sound through the tested sample.

The first ultrasonic thickness gauge was made in 1967 by Werner Sobek; a Polish engineer from Katowice. This first ultrasonic thickness gauge measured the velocity of the waves it emitted in particular test samples, it then calculated the thickness in micrometers from this speed measurement by an applied mathematical equation.

There are two types of transducers that can be used as an ultrasonic thickness gauge. These sensors are piezoelectric and EMAT sensors. Both transducer types emit sound waves into the material when excited. Typically these transducers use a predetermined frequency, however certain thickness gauges allow for frequency tuning in order to inspect a wider range of material. A standard frequency used by an ultrasonic thickness gauge is 5 MHz.

Some ultrasonic coating thickness gauges require that a couplant in gel, paste or liquid format be used to eliminate gaps between the transducer and the test piece. One common couplant is propylene glycol, but there are many other options which can be substituted.

Today there are many high tech models on the market. Modern digital thickness gauge has the capability of saving data and outputting to a variety of other data logging devices. A user friendly interface and saved data and settings allows for the utmost of ease for operators. This allows for even relatively novice users to obtain cost effective and accurate measurements.

== Advantages ==
- Non-destructive technique
- Does not require access to both sides of the sample
- Can be engineered to cope with coatings, linings, etc.
- Good accuracy (0.1 mm and less) can be achieved using standard timing techniques
- Can be easily deployed, does not require laboratory conditions
- Relatively cheap equipment
- EMAT does not require the use of couplant.
- EMAT can conduct thickness measurements through corrosion and other surface coatings on metals
- No need to remove the coating of the metal.

== Disadvantages ==
- Usually requires calibration for each material
- Requires good contact with the material
- Cannot take measurement over rust (Does not apply to EMAT)
- Requires coupling material between the measured surface and the probe. (Does not apply to EMAT)
- Interpretation needs experience

== Typical usage ==
UTM is frequently used to monitor metal thickness or weld quality in industrial settings such as mining. NDE technicians equipped with portable UTM probes reach steel plating in sides, tanks, decks and the superstructure. They can read its thickness by simply touching the steel with the measurement head (transducer). Contact is usually assured by first removing visible corrosion scale and then applying petroleum jelly or another couplant before pressing the probe against metal. However, when UTM is used with an electromagnetic acoustic transducer the use of couplant is not required. These testing methods are used to inspect metal to determine quality and safety without destroying or compromising its integrity. It is a requirement of many classification societies

The techniques and technologies associated with UTM are closely related to the use of ultrasound in other contexts, such as the various other industrial ultrasonic measurements, as well as medical ultrasonography and preclinical imaging micro-ultrasound. UTM technology combined with wireless data transfer is now being used by some companies to monitor live the thickness of metals in transfer chutes.

== Classification requirements for UTM hull surveys ==
Classification societies have detailed requirements for the thickness measurement of hull structures. These requirement depend greatly on vessels type, age and length. All IACS member classifications have similar requirements since they need to comply with IACS guidelines. The allowable diminution thickness depends on the building rules of each classification. Also depending on type the societies request one or two operators. The UTM operators need to be Level II certified according with SNT-TC-1A or similar standard. Also the company that performs the ultrasonic thickness measurement survey must be approved by the classification that the vessel is registered with. The classification society review the documented procedures of the UTM company and audit them on board in order to issue an approval certificate. Finally the equipment used need to be type approved by the classifications.
