= Train inspection system =

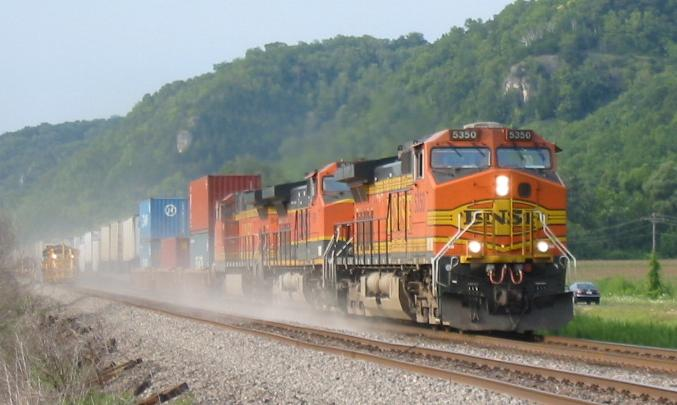
American freight service

A train inspection system is one of various systems of inspection which are essential to maintain the safe running of rail transport.

Because safety is of high importance when train cars move across the rails, there must be inspections. The cars are heavy and have moving parts that can break or become defective. Worn or broken parts can drag, pound, and generally destroy the cars and the track structure they run on. Parts and loads must not extend outside the limits of the car, and there should be no leaking of the cars' contents.

Quality inspections are needed not just before a train is moved, but also as it travels to its destination.

== Overview ==
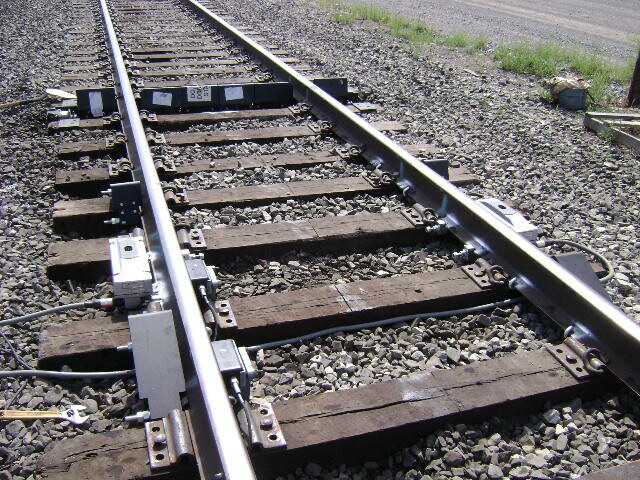
A hot bearing detector w/ dragging equipment unit

There are several levels of inspection on railroad equipment. Inspections are continuous, starting when the car is being built and repeated at regular intervals.

Before the train begins its journey, the locomotives and the cars are checked. This is done by mechanical department workers, sometimes cameras and scanners are also used. Some of the items certified good to go are things like the braking system including hand-brake release, brake application, condition of the air valves, piping and hoses, communication equipment, and many more. Very much like the checklist an airline might use. When the pretrip work is done, the train is considered safe to move.

Once the movement begins, the train is continuously watched by employees, scanners and monitors. These are sometimes called "in motion defect detectors" or defect detectors (DD).

== Technologies ==
As the railroad has evolved from block stations and control towers to a centralized dispatching system, they have also moved to more advanced inspection tools. The technologies in use today vary from a simplistic paddle and switch to infrared thermography, laser scanning, and even ultrasonic audio analysis. These devices are used to inspect engines, cars and the loads on them.

The systems used on North American and other railways fall into a dozen or so major groups, some are listed below.

=== Wheel impact load detector (WILD) ===
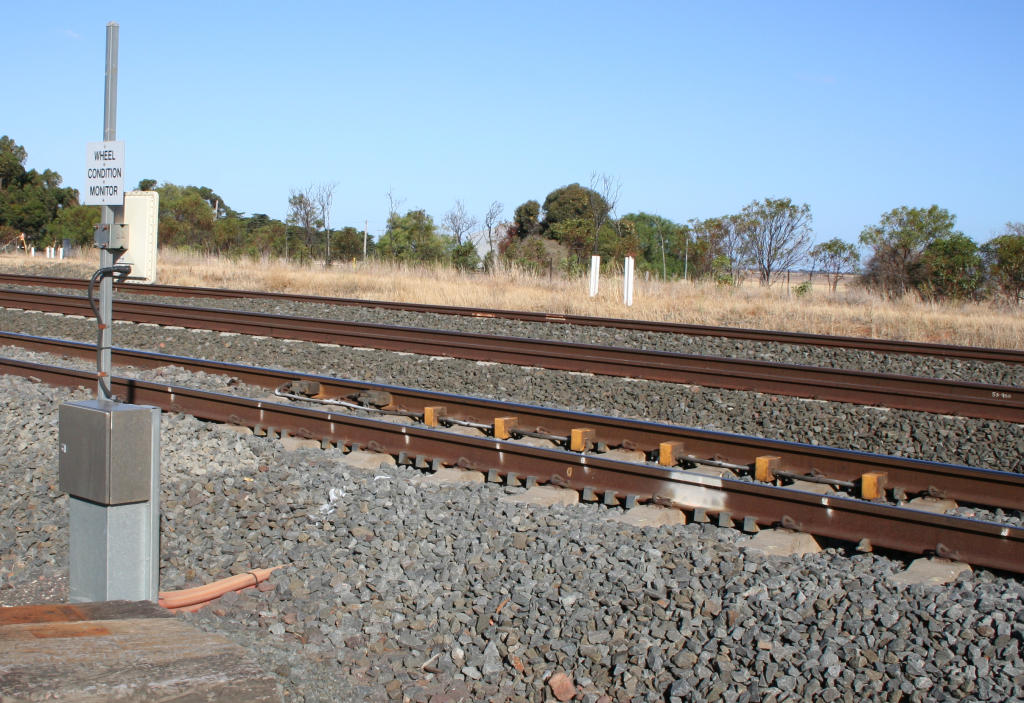
Sensors for a railway wheel impact load monitor, Lara, Victoria, Australia

High impact wheels have some defect where it does not roll smoothly along the track. A flaw in a wheel causes vibrations or banging. This is very destructive to the track structure and the rolling stock.

=== Weigh in motion (WIM) ===
Checks for overloads or shifted loads that can be dangerous.

=== Truck hunting ===
Truck hunting

Looks for hunting oscillation of the trucks or wheelset; a lateral movement in the gauge of the track, like drifting back and forth in a lane of traffic. This action can increase above a certain speed to the point the wheel flanges impact the rails, potentially causing damage to both. There is also force absorbed by this action that will affect the energy consumption of train operations.

=== Truck performance ===
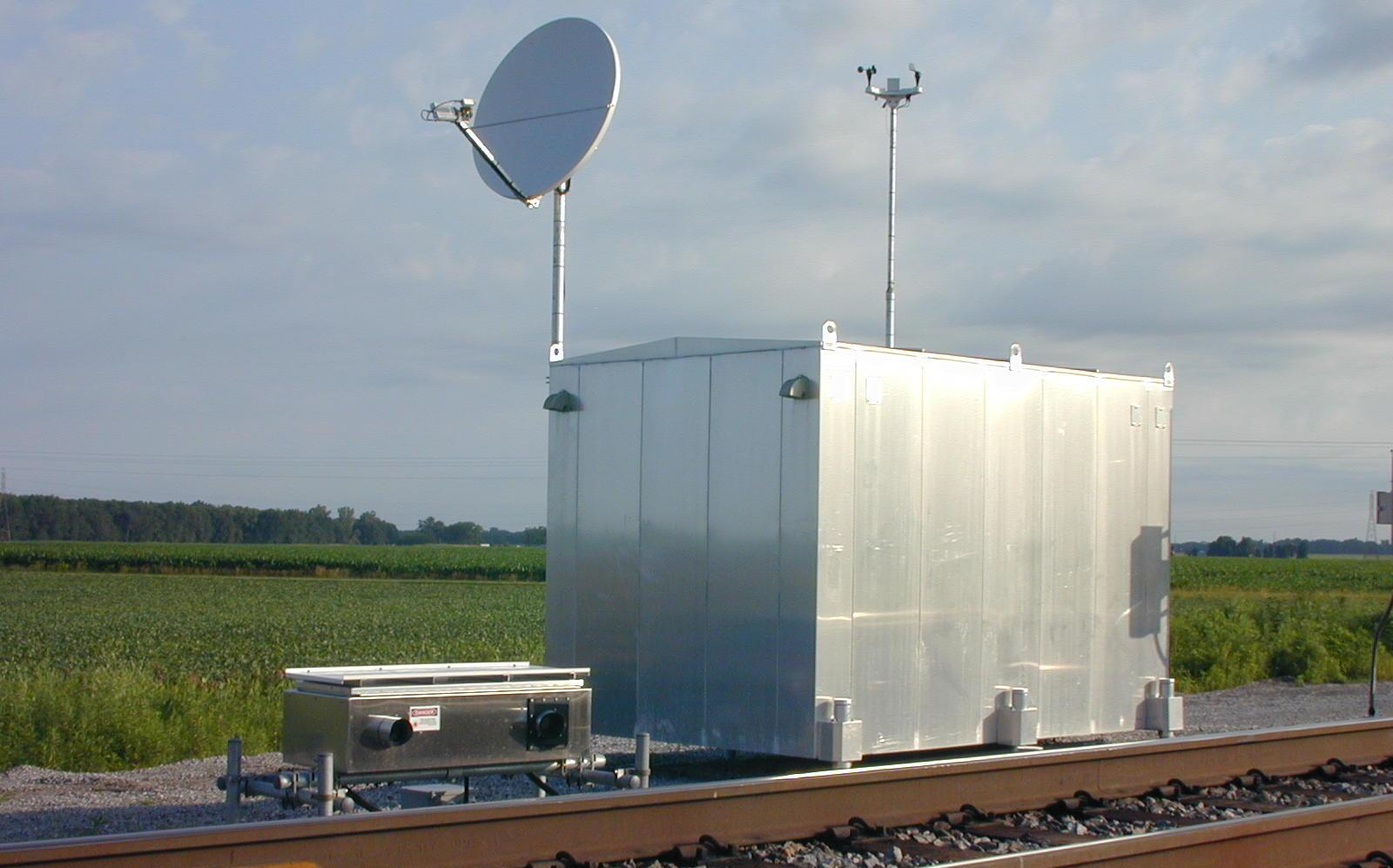
Truck hunting and performance detector—TBOGI system

Is stiff or poorly steering or axle sets that don't follow the path of the track correctly. Presents itself like 'dog tracking" where the trucks are biased to run against the flange on one side or the other. Truck performance defects include tracking position and angle of attack on a per-axle basis, as well as rotation, shift, inter-axle misalignment, and tracking error on a per-bogie basis. Truck performance detectors can provide early detection of bogie defects, and early warning of derailment risks through flange climb or rail break.

=== Acoustic bearing detectors ===
Listens with special microphones for internal bearing defects as the equipment moves across the detector. These are very sensitive and can detect problems before the bearing fails.

=== High wheel temperature detectors ===
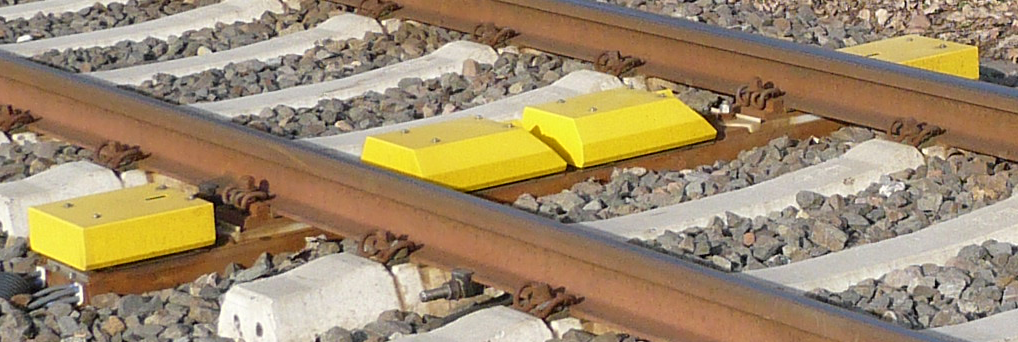
Hot box and hot wheel detection system, PHOENIX MB (SST Signal & System Technik GmbH)

Look for hot wheels, which are generally caused by braking equipment failures. This equipment may be combined with bearing temperature detectors (below).

=== Bearing temperature scanners ("hot box" detectors) ===
This type of defect detector uses ultra sensitive infrared cameras called pyrometers. These devices take the temperature of each bearing as it passes by the scanner. This data is then compared to preset "Alarm limits". If the whole consist is without problems, the train is passed. If however there is overheating in one or more of the bearings (a hot box), an alarm is given.

These messages can be by radio to the train crew or might be sent to the dispatch center for handling. The data is also used to detect a trend over several locations that might predict a future failure. If an alarm is sent, the train is stopped, and either the defect is corrected or the offending car is removed for repair. Many derailments are avoided by these devices which is why thousands of them are in use on rail systems across the world.

=== Dragging equipment detectors ===
As the name suggests, they are able to detect things hanging or dragging under the cars. These consist of a series of plates mounted on a pivot shaft. An object hanging or dragging will contact the plates, moving them and breaking a circuit. This will trigger an alarm and alert the crew. Many are stand-alone detectors, but most often are integrated into bearing temperature scanning locations.

=== High/wide sensors ===
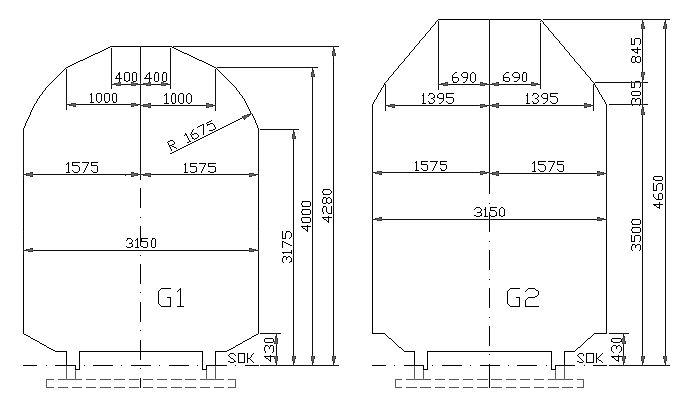
Railway clearance G1 and G2 (Germany)

These are able to measure the height and width of rolling stock, so that cars and loads which won't fit under bridges or through tunnels are stopped. Most often they are optical line of sight devices that trigger an alarm when the beam is broken. They are often seen at a bearing temperature scanning locations, they then report out as part of the detectors regular train inspection report. Mounted on poles or a bridge structure, the optical line is adjusted for a set height and width, it can then send an alarm when something too big to fit the clearance limits ahead passes its view.

=== Derailment detector ===
Is a simple "broken wire" type device that notifies the train crew they are off the track somewhere in their train.

=== Pantograph inspection ===
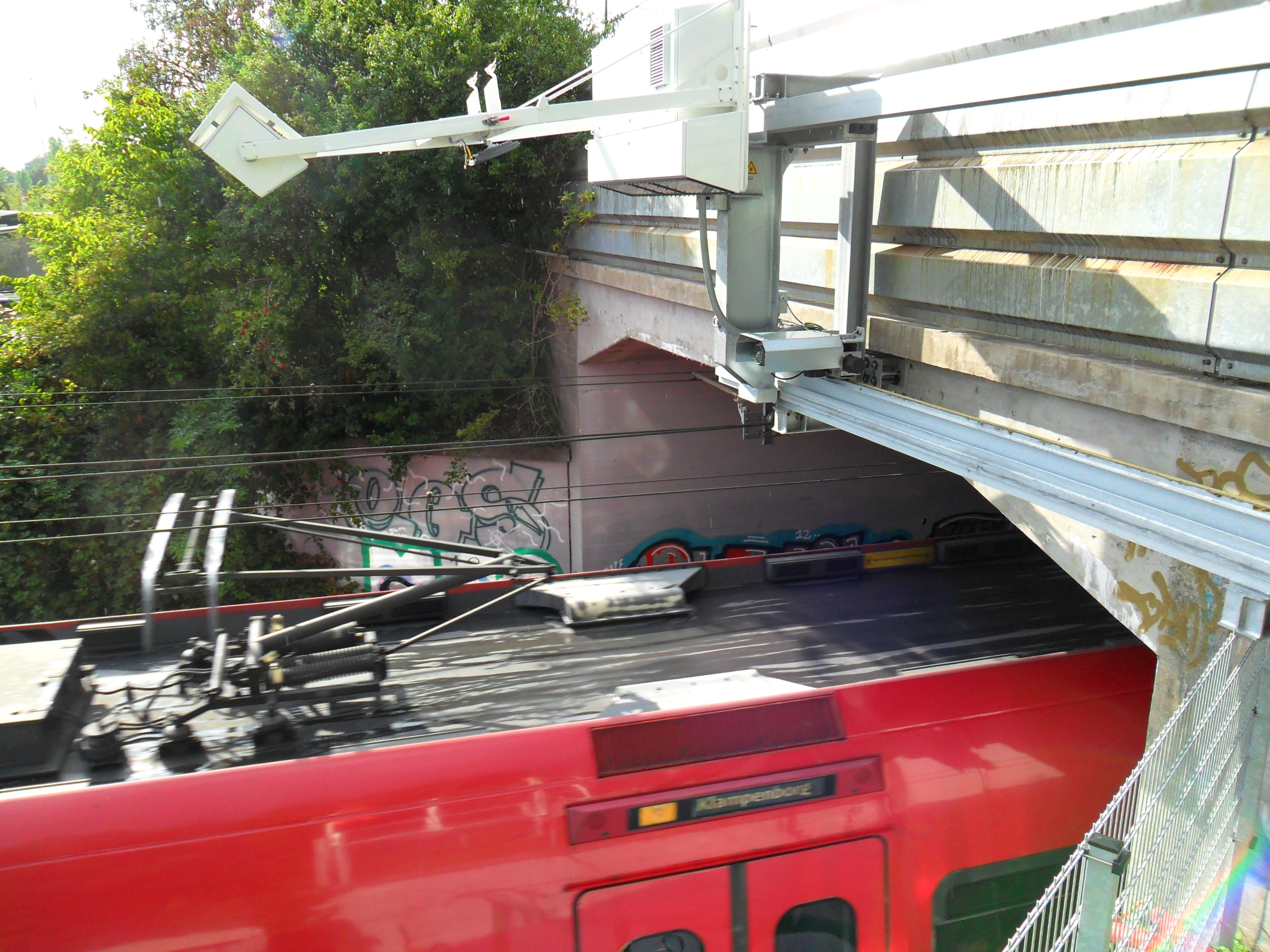
An automated scanner inspects the pantograph of a passing train.

A system which monitors the integrity of the pantograph. These are normally based on a vision system which takes pictures of the pantographs and performs an analysis based on computer vision algorithms. A pantograph uses a carbon strip to conduct electricity between the catenary and the pantograph. When these are damaged or worn out, the pantograph can tear down the catenary causing train delays.

=== Wheel Profile monitors ===
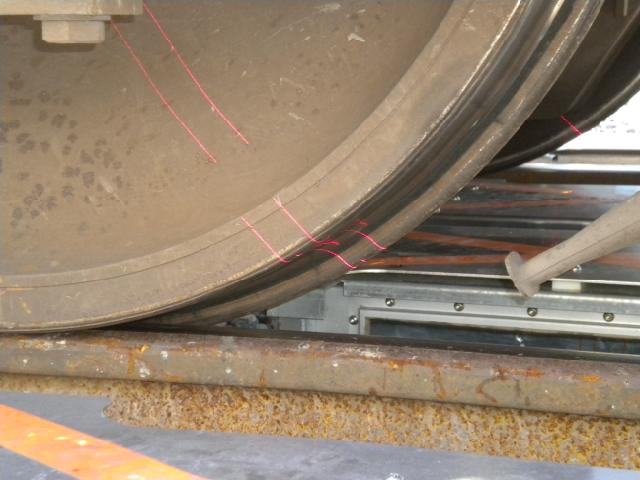
A laser wheel profile detector

Laser and optical scanning wayside inspection devices (known as TBOGI—Truck Bogie Optical Geometry Inspection Systems) make images of the flange and tread. These measurements are compared with acceptable dimensions. When worn beyond limits, the wheels are scheduled for replacement. If beyond a safe level the axle set is removed from service.

=== Trend monitoring systems ===
These back office systems are predictive, finding equipment problems as they start to develop.

== See also ==
- Axle counter
- Derailment
- Rail terminology
