= Adhesive bonding in structural steel applications =

Application or bonding methods

Adhesive bonding is a process by which two members of equal or dissimilar composition are joined. It is used in place of, or to complement other joining methods such mechanical fasting by the use nails, rivets, screws or bolts and many welding processes. The use of adhesives provides many advantages over welding and mechanical fastening in steel construction; however, many challenges still exist that have made the use of adhesives in structural steel components very limited.

== Types of structural adhesives ==
Structural adhesives is a term that was first introduced to described thermoset adhesives with a high modulus of elasticity used in load-bearing metallic structures. Structural adhesives can be used to create load-bearing joints. Although many adhesives such as sealants, hot melt adhesives and even acrylic foam tapes can bear loads, the term structural adhesive is typically used where joints will have lap shear strength greater than 1450 psi. The different types of structural adhesives are:

- Epoxies
- Toughened acrylics
- Polyurethanes
- Cyanoacrylates
- Anaerobics
- Phenolics
- Vinyl acetates

Which adhesive to use is typically based on the materials being joined and the service conditions as some will perform better than others in certain situations.

== Benefits ==
There are many benefits of using adhesives in place of mechanical fasteners to join two or more members. Some of these benefits include:

- Ability of the adhesive to distribute loads evenly throughout the bond line while mechanical fasteners generate areas of higher stress concentration.
- Eliminates the costly operation of drilling or punching holes in members to be connected.
- Reduction in weight and better aesthetics

When comparing to thermal processes like welding and brazing, joining with adhesives also has several significant advantages. Some are

- Ease of joining dissimilar metals
- No distortion or warpage of parts due to heat input
- Reduction of additional operations such as grinding and polishing
- Significantly less skill required compared to welding and brazing

Structural adhesives also present a significant advantage due to their ability to join composite materials which are continuously being developed to increase rigidity and decrease weight in many structures, especially in the aerospace and automotive industry. A significant amount of composites are not joinable by welding and drilling to use mechanical fastening can damage the material.

The development of higher shear strength adhesives has allowed the automotive industry to take advantage of composite materials when building cars, buses and other vehicles. Carbon fiber reinforced polymers (CFRP) are being used extensively in the automotive and aerospace industry due to their high strength-to-weight ratio. This material cannot be welded or brazed. Using fasteners would require drilling or punching which would damage this material. Adhesives are the only viable alternative for joining CRFPs to steel, aluminum and other materials.

Other than reducing the weight of a vehicle and maintaining or increasing the strength of the joint, the use of CFRP joined to metals with adhesives can help improve the fatigue life of the joint. A study of the behavior of adhesive joints of steel with CFRP proposed a new joint that connects five steel members with the use of a CFRP node.

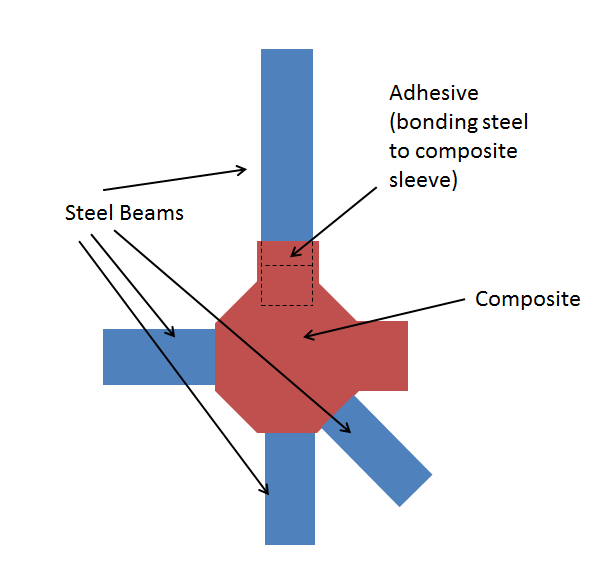
The study by P. Galvez replaced a complicated welded joint with a CFRP node. The node was adhesively bonded to the steel beams.

With design changes that would place the adhesive joint under pure shear and no peel stresses, which are the most harmful for all adhesives, the new joint was able to sustain all loads which would be transferred through the joint. The elimination of welds got rid of thermal cycles, weld starts and stops, and possible weld discontinuities such as undercut, overlap and cracks that can severely decrease the fatigue life of the structure.

All of the above-mentioned advantages make joining with adhesives very advantageous in many applications. However, the use of adhesives in heavy structural steel applications has not been established mainly due to doubts by engineers, architects and contractors regarding adhesives’ load bearing capabilities and performance is unfavorable conditions.

The benefit of welding as a joining process for steel is that it creates a bond that is almost always stronger than the components it is joining. This is why welding can be used to join the seams of pressure vessels and used to perform complete joint penetration welds on structural components that require high tensile strengths. As long as adequate welding procedures are followed the joint will be stronger than the base metal.

Adhesives today cannot provide the strength that a welded joint can, which typically has a minimum tensile strength of 60,000 psi and above. However, there are many applications within steel construction where the use of adhesives would be acceptable. Many times joints that are welded do not need the full strength of the filler metal. Other times, like in the case where the applied stress is tension or compression parallel to the axis of the weld, the strength of the weld is not a design consideration.

A significant advantage of bonding with adhesives instead of welding is that there is not enough heat generated to create any kind of undesirable effects due to thermal cycling. Welding creates a non-uniform expansion and contraction of the weld metal and the base metal. This expansion and contraction cycle can create several problems including distortion, embrittlement of the heat affected zone, and residual stresses. All of this is not present as in the case discussed above where a welded joint was replaced with a CFRP node.

== Challenges ==
The major concerns with replacing welding or mechanical fastening with adhesives are related to the durability of adhesively bonded joints under adverse conditions. The strength difference is well known and can be managed with proper design and knowing when not to use adhesives. However, knowing how the adhesive will behave under different service conditions remains an area with a certain degree of uncertainty. The following variables must be taken into account when considering if the use of adhesives is a viable option.

- Service conditions – this includes temperature range, humidity, indoor/outdoor use, exposure to ultraviolet rays
- Resistance to chemicals – will the joint come in contact with chemicals that can affect the structural integrity of the bond (i.e. oil, gasoline, acids, etc.)
- Mechanical challenges – will the bonded joint be exposed to abrasion, impact, vibration, fatigue loading. Thermal cycles are also considered here.
- Stress type and magnitude (shear, tensile, compression, etc.)

Another issue to consider when thinking about replacing welding or mechanical fastening with adhesive bonding is the time that it takes for the adhesive to be able to hold the parts in place without them having to be held in place by fixtures, clamps or other devices. Adhesives require a certain amount of time from when they are applied until they can be handled without the parts joined being moved out of place. This means that as soon as the adhesive is applied to the members being joined the parts have to be held in place until the adhesive reaches its handling strength (green strength). This can add significant amounts of time to the fabrication process. Parts joined by welding can be handled right away in most cases.

The use of adhesives for joining steel is increasing, but it is used mainly on very thin sections. When looking at heavy structural steel it is mainly used complement other joining processes such as welding and bolting. However, its use is not governed by a code so many engineers and designers shy away from its use. Structural codes allow for the use of other joining processes but it makes it the responsibility of the engineer in charge to develop, test and approve such joining procedure.

The challenge for the engineer becomes finding enough data related to adhesives and their specific application. Engineers that rely heavily in the AISC manual for steel construction and AWS D1.1 for guidance have found out that the word “adhesive” appears only three times in the 604-page long AWS D1.1/D1.1M:2015 Structural Welding Code – Steel and only as part of the title of a reference standard (AWS A3.0, Standard Welding Terms and Definitions, Including Terms for Adhesive Bonding, Brazing, Soldering, Thermal Cutting and Thermal Spraying). The word “adhesive” does not appear even once in ANSI/AISC 360-16 Specification for Structural Steel Buildings. This specification spells out design requirements, as well as fabrication and erection requirements for the construction of steel buildings.

Because of this responsibility and potential liability adhesives in structural steel are not used very often. Even in the case where it can be used in combination with mechanical fastening as is the case of bolts, calculating the total capacity of the connection is not as simple as adding the load-bearing capacity of the adhesive and that of the bolts. This is similar to mixing welds with bolts in structural connections. Assuming that the strength of the connection is the sum of the individual components is not conservative and can prove disastrous

=== Other challenges ===
Other challenges exist with the use of adhesives in structural steel, some of these include:

- Need to overlap material which requires more material compared to butt joints.
- Inspection can be difficult - visual inspection is extremely limited and NDE typically requires the use of ultrasonic testing.
- Surface preparation for the use of adhesives can become complicated in the field where material are exposed to the elements and can develop rust and oxide layers relatively quickly.
- Added time to cure - some adhesives require long curing times which can stop or delay production.
