= Breivoll Inspection Technologies AS =

- Founded: 1998
- Founder: John D. Breivoll
- Headquarters: Tromsø, Norway
- Services: Condition assessment of water pipes
- Number of employees: 5
- Website: en.breivoll.no

Breivoll Inspection Technologies (BIT) have in close collaboration with Det Norske Veritas (DNV) and other partners developed a system for condition assessment of water pipelines. The company is the first world-wide to perform condition assessments of water pipes with the use of a pipescanner based on ART (Acoustic Resonance Technology). The targeted customers include managers of water networks, consultants, entrepreneurs and authorities. BIT were the recipients of the 2007 Norwegian Engineering Award. The company has offices in Tromsø and Oslo, Norway.

== History ==
In 1992, Det Norske Veritas (DNV) was hired by the Norwegian authorities to develop technology to detect any remaining oil in the sunken German WW2 warship Blücher. The technology they advised was based on acoustic resonance, and it was discovered that as a bi-product it can also be used to measure the thickness of metallic plates. This discovery was the foundation of DNV's effort to develop a whole new inspection technology, based on ART (Acoustic Resonance Technology). John D. Breivoll had worked closely with DNV to inspect sewer mains since the 1980s. Since there were no good methods to inspect water mains in the same way as one can inspect sewer mains, John D. Breivoll saw the potential of the ART technology for the water sector, and while DNV primarily saw the use of the technology in oil related industries, John D. Breivoll started Breivoll Inspection Technologies AS with Arne Christian Vangdal in 1998 to license ART for the water sector.

== Technology ==
To be able to inspect water-filled distribution mains, the company has developed a Pipescanner which is neutrally buoyant and carries 64 custom-made transducers through the water pipe. The scanner collects roughly 200 MB of acoustic resonance data per meter, which is then stored and sent to analysis. A custom software-suite based on ART (Acoustic Resonance Technology) is then used to translate the resonance data to information about remaining wall thickness, internal corrosion and external corrosion.

== Awards ==
BIT were the recipients of the 2007 Norwegian Engineering Award, given by the technical magazine Teknisk Ukeblad "for their work within socially beneficial infrastructure management".

In 2008, the Norwegian Research Council awarded the first Industrial Ph.D. stipend to BIT and to their employee Martin Skjelvareid Hansen.
