= Pantograph (transport) =

Power collection apparatus used by trains and light rail

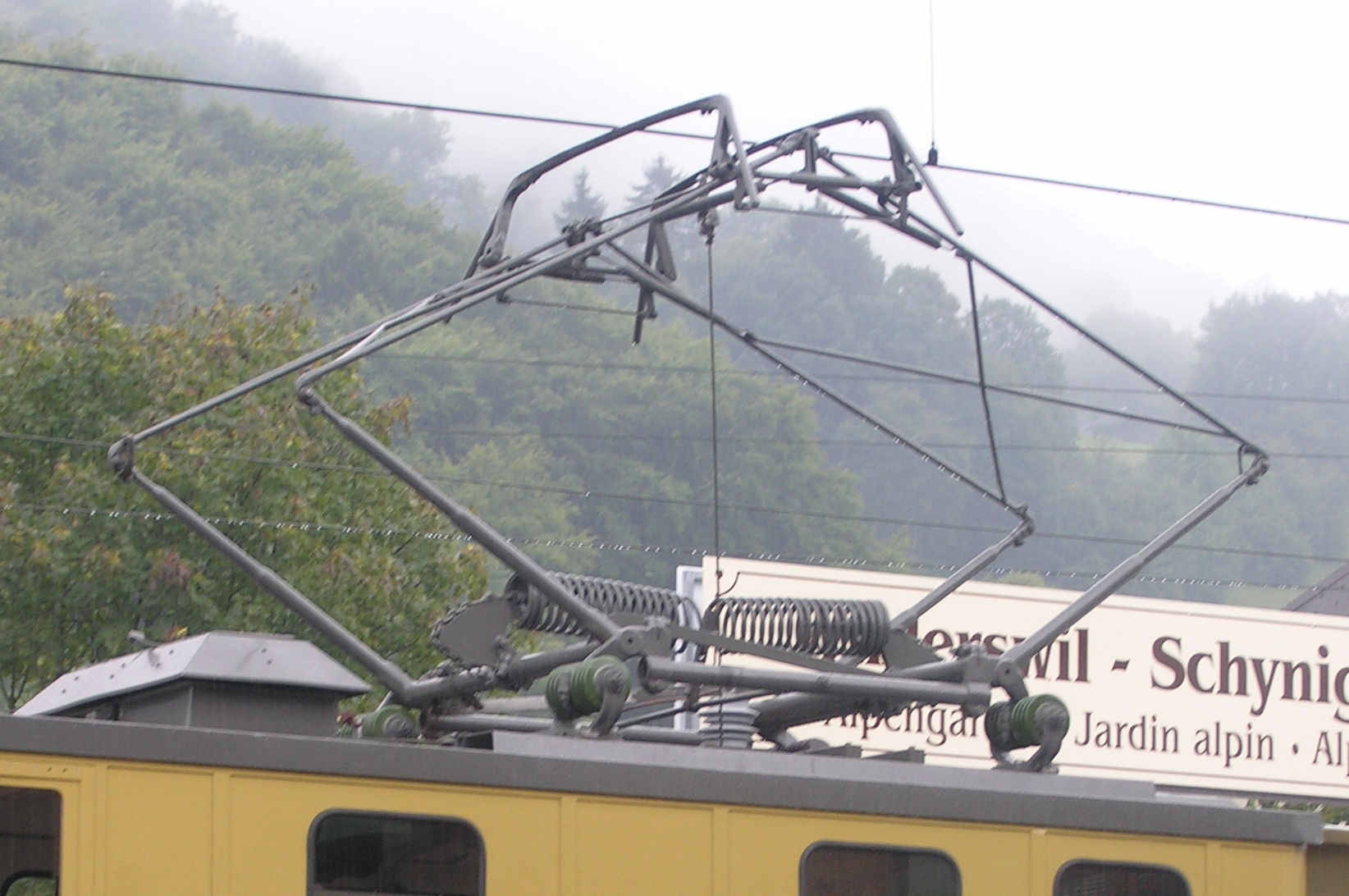
The diamond-shaped, electric-rod pantograph of the Swiss cogwheel locomotive of the Schynige Platte railway in Schynige Platte, built in 1911

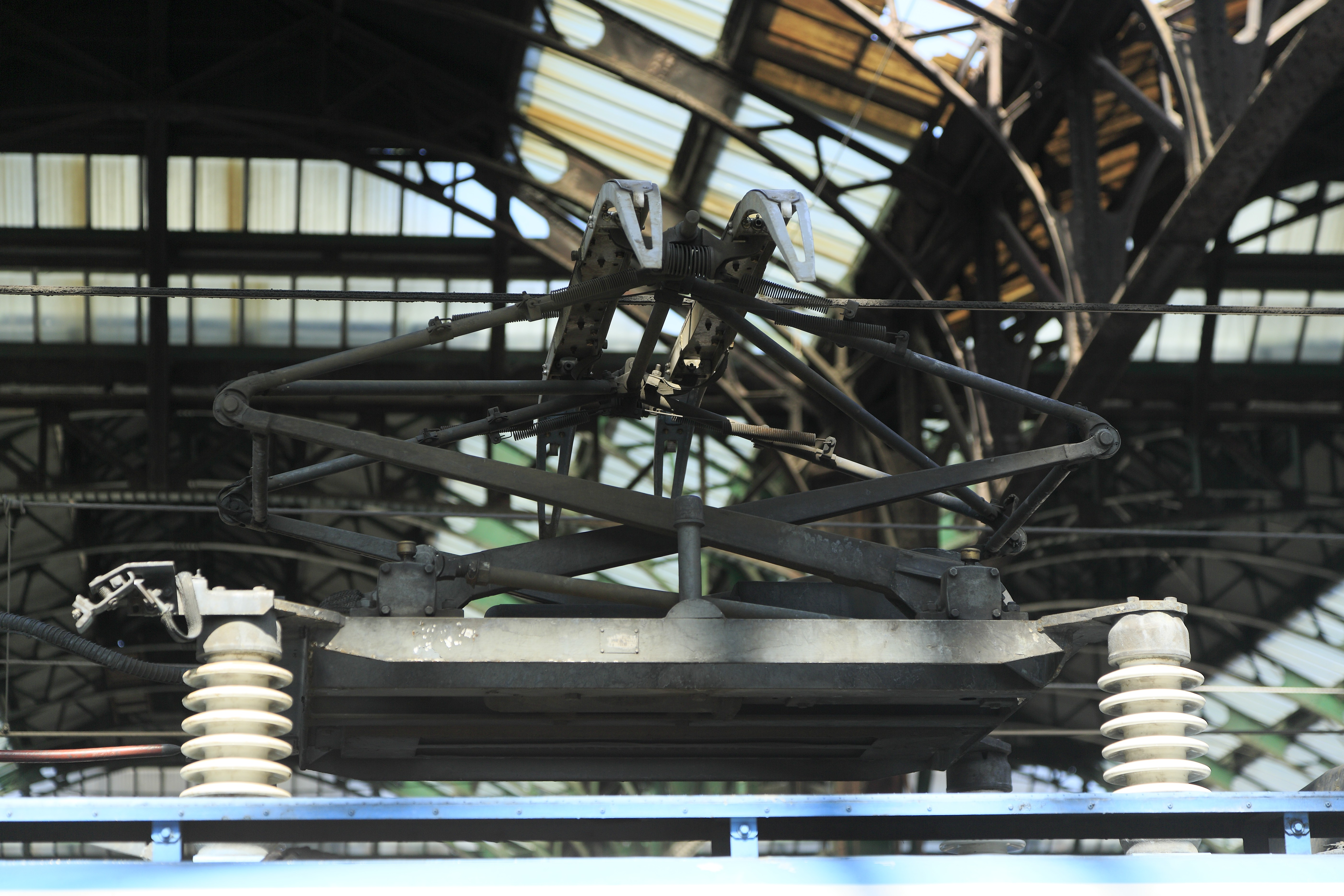
Cross-arm pantograph of a Toshiba EMU

A pantograph (or "pan" or "panto") is an apparatus mounted on the roof of an electric train, tram or battery electric buses to collect power through contact with an overhead line. The term stems from the resemblance of some styles to the mechanical pantographs used for copying handwriting and drawings.

The pantograph is a common type of current collector; typically, a single or double wire is used, with the return current running through the rails. Other types of current collectors include the bow collector and the trolley pole.

== Invention ==
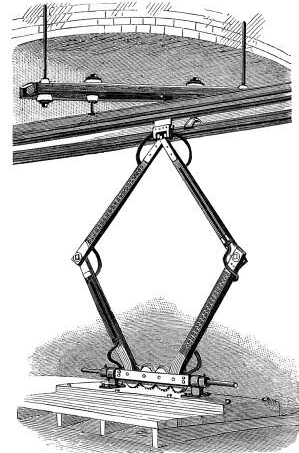
Early (1895) flat pantograph on a Baltimore & Ohio Railroad electric locomotive. The brass contact ran inside the Π-section bar, so both lateral and vertical flexibility was necessary.

The pantograph, with a low-friction, replaceable graphite contact strip or "shoe" to minimise lateral stress on the contact wire, first appeared in the late 19th century. Early versions include the bow collector, invented in 1889 by Walter Reichel, chief engineer at Siemens & Halske in Germany, and a flat slide-pantograph first used in 1895 by the Baltimore and Ohio Railroad.

The familiar diamond-shaped roller pantograph was devised and patented by John Q. Brown of the Key System shops for their commuter trains which ran between San Francisco and the East Bay section of the San Francisco Bay Area in California. They appear in photographs of the first day of service, 26 October 1903. For many decades thereafter, the same diamond shape was used by electric-rail systems around the world and remains in use by some today.

The pantograph was developed as an improvement on the simple trolley pole, which prevailed up to that time, with design goals of allowing large variations in height of the overhead wire and allowing an electric-rail vehicle to travel at much higher speeds without losing contact with the overhead lines, e.g. due to dewirement of the trolley pole. Notwithstanding this, trolley pole current collection was used successfully at up to 140 km/h (90 mph) on the Electroliner vehicles of the Chicago North Shore and Milwaukee Railroad, also known as the North Shore Line.

== Modern use ==
The most common type of pantograph today is the so-called half-pantograph (sometimes Z-shaped), which evolved to provide a more compact and responsive single-arm design at high speeds as trains got faster. Louis Faiveley invented this type of pantograph in 1955. The half-pantograph can be seen in use on everything from very fast trains (such as the TGV) to low-speed urban tram systems. The design operates with equal efficiency in either direction of motion, as demonstrated by the Swiss and Austrian railways whose newest high-performance locomotives, the Re 460 and Taurus, operate with them set in the opposite direction. In Europe the geometry and shape of the pantographs are specified by CENELEC, the European Committee for Electrotechnical Standardization.

While a pantograph is mainly used to power a railway traction unit, there are certain cases where it has a function other than traction:

- Mechanical measurements and tests of new catenary (with or without voltage), on a catenary and contact line inspection car;
- General power supply of a measuring car;
- Power supply of an air-conditioned train (for example: pantograph mounted on a Renfe van for the 3,000 V DC power supply of the rest of the train via the UIC train line, or heating line), in the absence of a locomotive;
- Power supply of a restaurant car when parked on a siding in the absence of a locomotive, under a catenary electrified with 15 kV AC 16 2/3 Hz; this system is used on restaurant cars of the Swiss and German railways;
- Grounding of the catenary during work carried out from certain work vehicles.
- Electric bus charging: The pantograph is normally retracted into a ceiling-mounted charger unit. When a bus is parked underneath, the pantograph extends downward to contact a pair of charging rails mounted on the roof of the bus. A sticker inside the bus's front door aligns with a green line painted on the garage floor to help the driver or garage attendant position the bus with the rails under the pantograph.

== Technical details ==
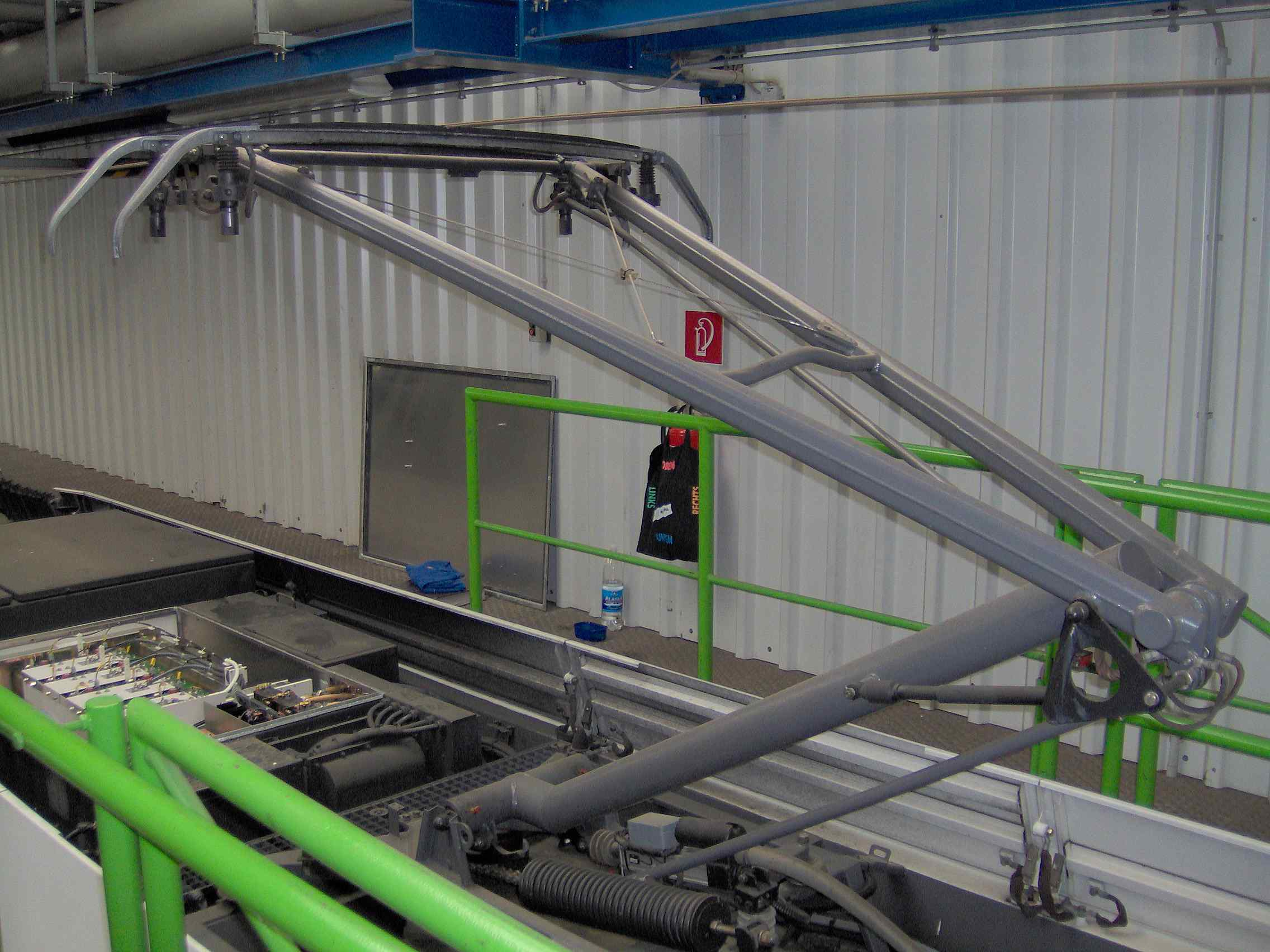
An (asymmetrical) Z-shaped pantograph used for electric trams

The electric transmission system for modern electric rail systems consists of an upper, weight-carrying wire (known as a catenary) from which is suspended a contact wire. The pantograph is spring-loaded and pushes a contact shoe up against the underside of the contact wire to draw the current needed to run the train. The steel rails of the tracks act as the electrical return. As the train moves, the contact shoe slides along the wire and can set up standing waves in the wires which break the contact and degrade current collection. This means that on some systems adjacent pantographs are not permitted.

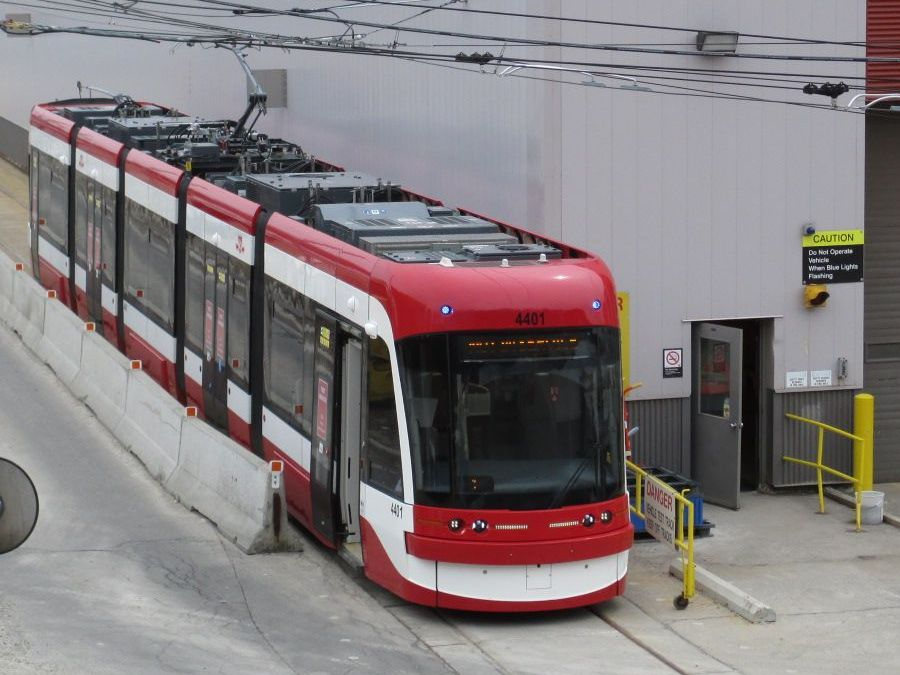
A Flexity Outlook LRV with its pantograph raised. Note the trolley pole in the rear, which provides compatibility with sections not yet upgraded for pantograph operation.

Pantographs are the successor technology to trolley poles, which were widely used on early streetcar systems. Trolley poles are still used by trolleybuses, whose freedom of movement and need for a two-wire circuit makes pantographs impractical, and some streetcar networks, such as the Toronto streetcar system, which have frequent turns sharp enough to require additional freedom of movement in their current collection to ensure unbroken contact. However, many of these networks, including Toronto's, are undergoing upgrades to accommodate pantograph operation.

Pantographs with overhead wires are now the dominant form of current collection for modern electric trains in city street, main and high speed lines because, although more fragile than a third rail system, they are safer for the public (protection by distance). They may also allow higher voltages (especially AC ones) and higher speed.

Pantographs are typically operated by compressed air from the vehicle's braking system, either to raise the unit and hold it against the conductor or, when springs are used to effect the extension, to lower it. As a precaution against loss of pressure in the second case, the arm is held in the down position by a catch. For high-voltage systems, the same air supply is used to "blow out" the electric arc when roof-mounted circuit breakers are used.

== Single and double pantographs ==
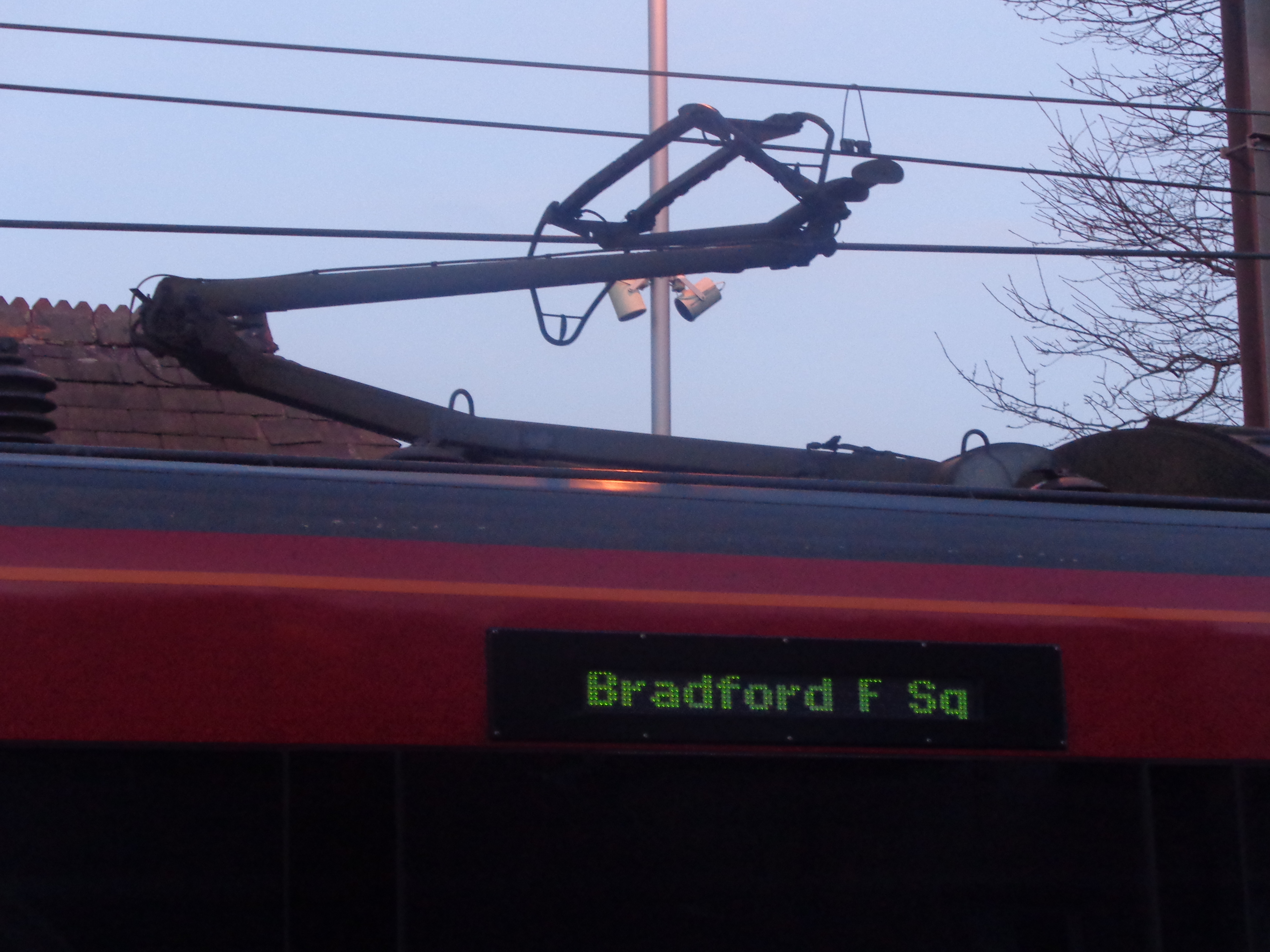
Close-up view of a Brecknell Willis pantograph on a British Rail Class 333

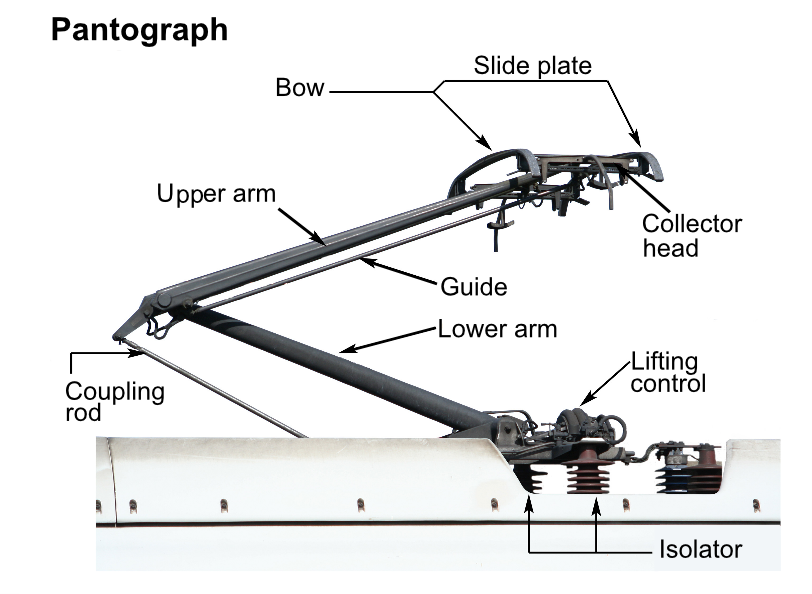
Diagram of parts of a pantograph from ICE S

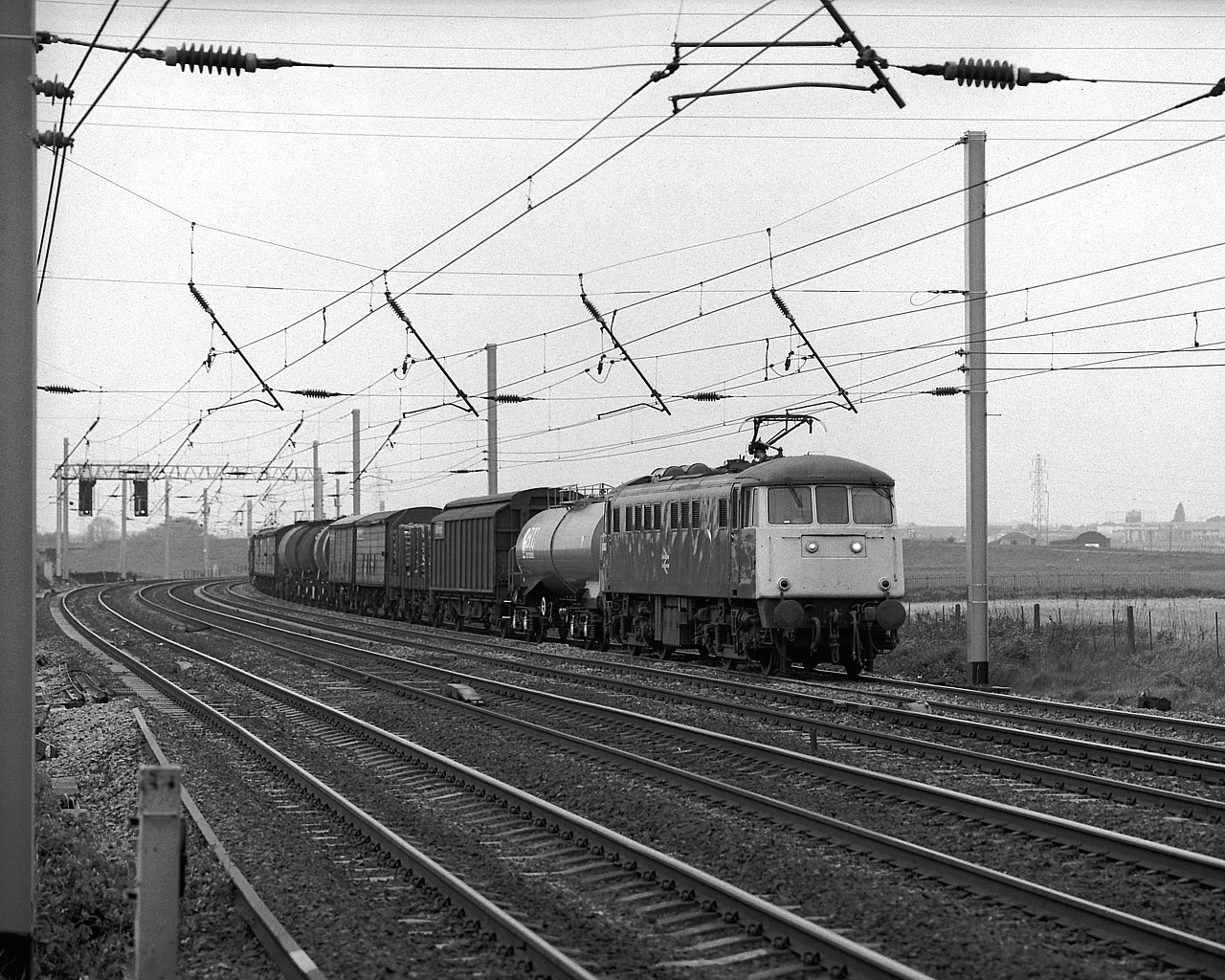
First-generation Faiveley single-arm pantograph on a British Rail Class 85 locomotive, used on early AC electric locomotives from the 1960s

Pantographs may have either a single or a double arm. Double-arm pantographs are usually heavier, requiring more power to raise and lower, but may also be more fault-tolerant.

On railways of the former USSR, the most widely used pantographs are those with a double arm ("made of two rhombs"), but, since the late 1990s, there have been some single-arm pantographs on Russian railways. Some streetcars use double-arm pantographs, among them the Russian KTM-5, KTM-8, LVS-86 and many other Russian-made trams, as well as some Euro-PCC trams in Belgium. American streetcars use either trolley poles or single-arm pantographs.

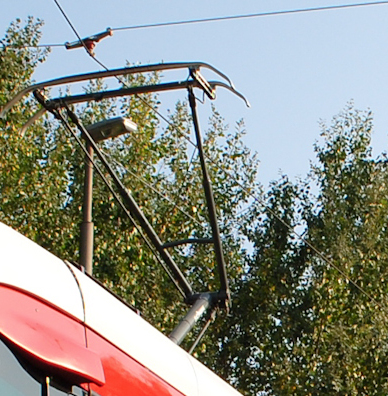
A Pantograph of a CAF tram in Belgrade

== Metro systems and overhead lines ==
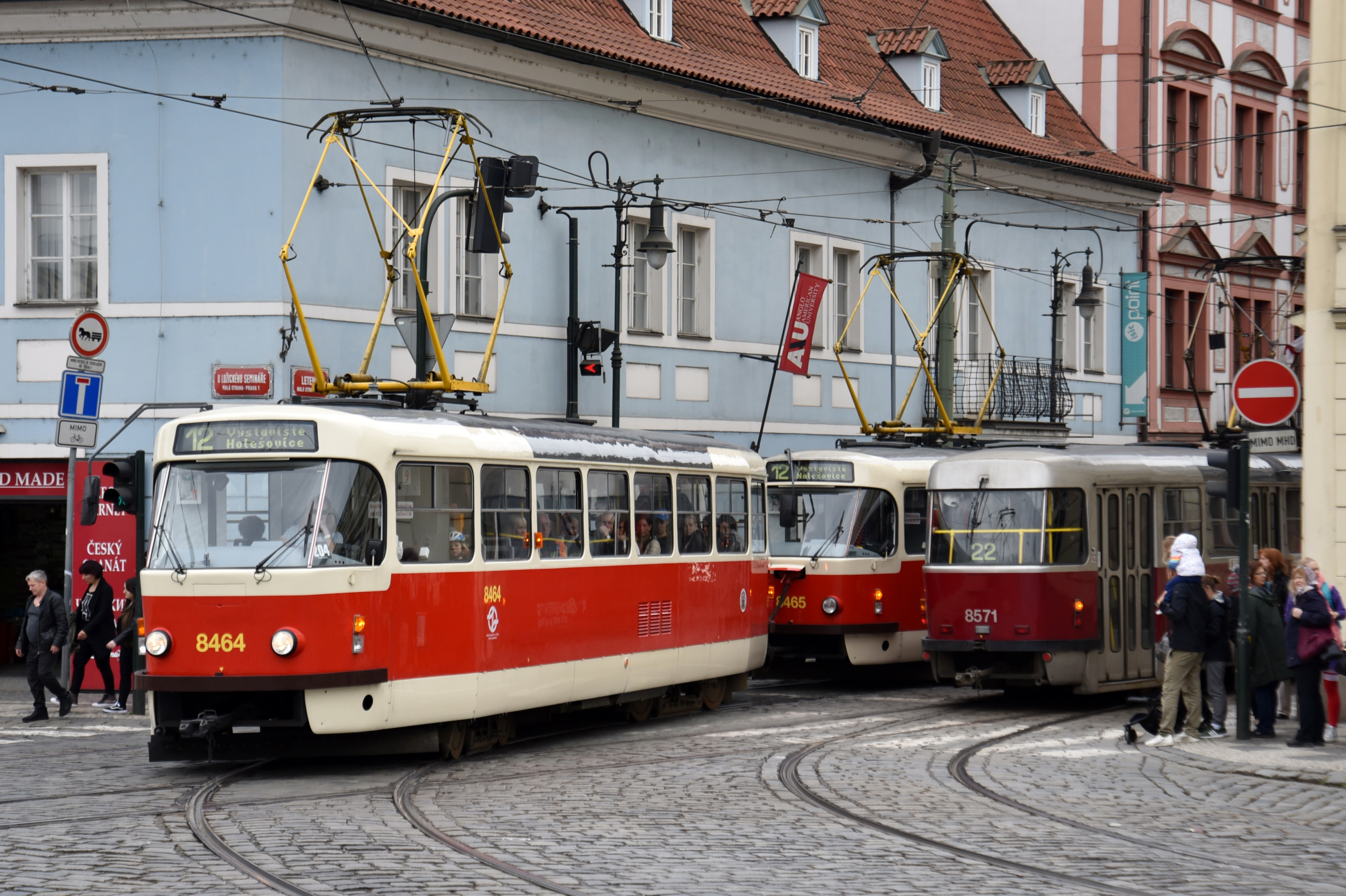
Symmetrical, diamond-shaped pantographs on a Prague tram

Most rapid transit systems are powered by a third rail, but some use pantographs, particularly ones that involve extensive above-ground running. Most hybrid metro-tram or 'pre-metro' lines whose routes include tracks on city streets or in other publicly accessible areas, such as (formerly) line 51 of the Amsterdam Metro, the MBTA Green Line, RTA Rapid Transit in Cleveland, Frankfurt am Main U-Bahn, and San Francisco's Muni Metro, use overhead wire, as a standard third rail would obstruct street traffic and present a great risk of electrocution.

Among the various exceptions are several tram systems, such as the ones in Bordeaux, Angers, Reims and Dubai that use a proprietary underground system developed by Alstom, called APS, which only applies power to segments of track that are completely covered by the tram. This system was originally designed to be used in the historic centre of Bordeaux because an overhead wire system would cause a visual intrusion. Similar systems that avoid overhead lines have been developed by Bombardier, AnsaldoBreda, CAF, and others. These may consist of physical ground-level infrastructure, or use energy stored in battery packs to travel over short distances without overhead wiring.

Overhead pantographs are sometimes used as alternatives to third rails because third rails can ice over in certain winter weather conditions. The MBTA Blue Line uses pantograph power for the entire section of its route that runs on the surface, while switching to third rail power before entering the underground portion of its route. The entire metro systems of Sydney, Madrid, Barcelona, Porto, Shanghai, Hong Kong, Seoul, Kobe, Fukuoka, Sendai, Jaipur, Chennai, Mumbai and Delhi use overhead wiring and pantographs (as well as certain lines of the metro systems in Beijing, Chongqing, Noida, Hyderabad, Jakarta, Tokyo, Osaka, Nagoya, Singapore, Sapporo, Budapest, and Mexico City). Pantographs were also used on the Nord-Sud Company rapid transit lines in Paris until the other operating company of the time, Compagnie du chemin de fer métropolitain de Paris, bought out the company and replaced all overhead wiring with the standard third rail system used on other lines.

Numerous railway lines use both third rail and overhead power collection along different portions of their routes, generally for historical reasons. They include the North London line and West London lines of London Overground, the Northern City Line of Great Northern, three of the five lines in the Rotterdam Metro network, Metro-North Railroad's New Haven Line, and the Chicago Transit Authority's Yellow Line. In this last case, the overhead portion was a remnant of the Chicago North Shore and Milwaukee Railroad's high-speed Skokie Valley Route, and was the only line on the entire Chicago subway system to utilize pantograph collection for any length. As such, the line required railcars that featured pantographs as well as third rail shoes, and since the overhead was a very small portion of the system, only a few cars would be so equipped. The changeover occurred at the grade crossing at East Prairie, the former site of the Crawford-East Prairie station. Here, trains bound for Dempster-Skokie would raise their pantographs, while those bound for Howard would lower theirs, doing so at speed in both instances. In 2005, due to the cost and unique maintenance needs for what only represented a very small portion of the system, the overhead system was removed and replaced with the same third rail power that was used throughout the rest of the system, which allowed all of Chicago's railcars to operate on the line. All the pantographs were removed from the Skokie equipped cars.

Until 2010, the Oslo Metro line 1 changed from third rail to overhead line power at Frøen station. Due to the many level crossings, it was deemed difficult to install a third rail on the rest of the older line's single track. After 2010 third rails were used in spite of level crossings. The third rails have gaps, but there are two contact shoes.

== Three-phase supply ==
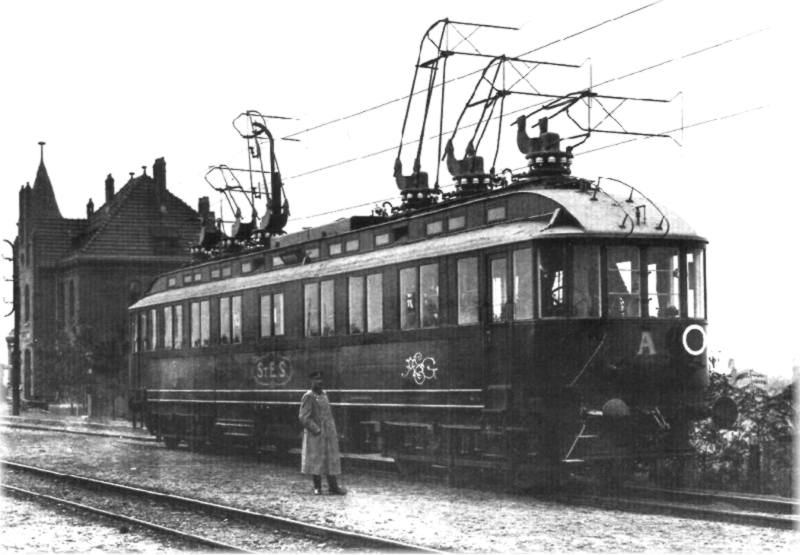
Experimental three-phase railcar, Germany, 1901

On some systems using three phase power supply, locomotives and power cars have two pantographs with the third-phase circuit provided by the running rails. In 1901 an experimental high-speed installation, another design from Walter Reichel at Siemens & Halske, used three vertically mounted overhead wires with the collectors mounted on horizontally extending pantographs.

== Inclined pantographs ==
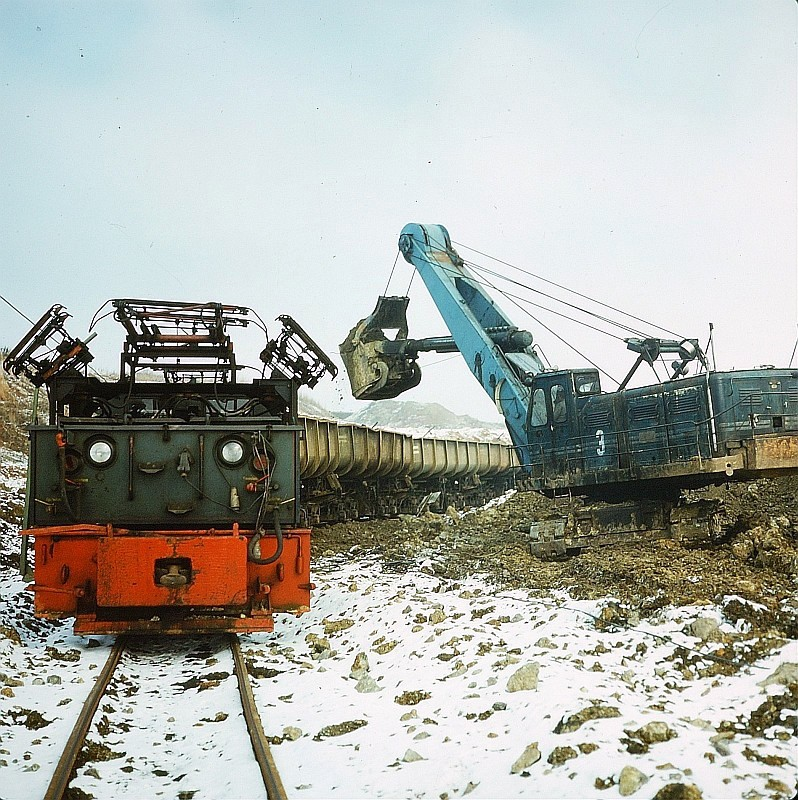
Tilted pantograph used with offset overhead line to allow loading of open wagons

On lines where open wagons are loaded from above, the overhead line may be offset to allow this; the pantographs are then mounted at an angle to the vertical.

== Weaknesses ==
Contact between a pantograph and an overhead line is usually assured through a block of graphite. This material conducts electricity while working as a lubricant. As graphite is brittle, pieces can break off during operation. Poorly-built pantographs can seize the overhead wire and tear it down, and poor-condition wires can damage the pantograph. To prevent this, a pantograph monitoring station can be used. At sustained high speeds, above 300 km/h (190 mph), friction can cause the contact strip to become red hot, which in turn can cause excessive arcing and eventual failure.

In the UK, the pantographs (Brecknell Willis and Stone Faiveley) of vehicles are raised by air pressure and the graphite contact "carbons" create an air gallery in the pantograph head which release the air if a graphite strip is lost, activating the automatic drop device and lowering the pantograph to prevent damage. Newer electric traction units may use more sophisticated methods which detect the disturbances caused by arcing at the point of contact when the graphite strips are damaged. There are not always two pantographs on an electric multiple unit but, in cases where there are, the other one can be used if one is damaged; an example of this situation would be a Class 390 Pendolino. The rear pantograph in relation to the direction of travel is often used as to avoid damaging both pantographs in case of entanglements: if the front pantograph was used, debris from an entanglement could cause damage to the rear pantograph, rendering both pantographs and the vehicle inoperable.

== Automatic dropping device ==
Automatic dropping device (ADD) is a device that automatically lowers the pantograph on electric trains to prevent additional damage in case of obstructions or emergencies. It is also known as pantograph dropping device.

In Europe, the automatic dropping device is mandatory for trains with operational speeds of 160 km/h or 120 km/h and higher if one or several pantographs are used respectively. Otherwise, the train operators are free to install these devices at their discretion. The damage that causes the pantograph to fall can include the strip head, the pantograph head, and other parts. Modern pantograph systems integrate an Automatic Dropping Device (ADD) connected to the vehicle's air pressure system. If the carbon contact strip is broken or damaged during operation, the ADD rapidly lowers the pantograph by releasing the internal air pressure. This failsafe mechanism is crucial to prevent further entanglement and extensive damage to the overhead line equipment.

The ADD mostly uses a pneumatic system to detect damage. For example, a broken contact strip will cause a pressure drop in the air tube inside. On non-pneumatic pantographs (mostly tramway or metro), solutions such as a pin on the pantograph head which pulls a cable to lower the pantograph. Nevertheless, operators are free to utilize it and performance requirements (distance, force, time...) are not defined.

Time reaction and reaction to quit overhead contact line are defined for main line use.

This function can be different to wearing detection made of a tube or insert place higher than ADD tube.

== Other ==
Several pantograph head profiles exist to meet electrical and mechanical infrastructure gauges of each country. In Europe, two interoperable profiles were defined with 1600 and 1950 mm length.

An infrastructure can accept several head profiles, especially with conductive or insulated horns. The Variopanto is a head with two possible lengths.

Flat pantographs are emerging to fit on narrow roof gauges, allowing flat roofs and reduced aerodynamic impact. They are made of an insulated lower arm contrary to a "classic" pantograph fixed on insulators. Example: ETR1000 pantograph

== See also ==
- Bow collector
- Current collector
- Pantographs and underbody collectors
- Railway electrification system
- Trolley pole
