= Acoustic resonance technology =

Inspection technology for measuring thickness

Acoustic resonance technology (ART) is an acoustic inspection technology developed by Det Norske Veritas over the past 20 years. ART exploits the phenomenon of half-wave resonance, whereby a suitably excited resonant target (such as a pipeline wall) exhibits longitudinal resonances at certain frequencies characteristic of the target's thickness. Knowing the speed of sound in the target material, the half-wave resonant frequencies can be used to calculate the target's thickness.

ART differs from traditional ultrasonic testing: although both are forms of nondestructive testing based on acoustics, ART generally uses lower frequencies and has a wider bandwidth. This has enabled its use in gaseous environments without a liquid couplant.

Det Norske Veritas has licensed the technology for use in on-shore water pipes worldwide to Breivoll Inspection Technologies AS. Breivoll has proven the efficiency of the technology in assessing the condition of metallic water pipes, both with and without coating. The company has since 2008 successfully developed a method to enter and inspect water mains, and is a world-leader in their market.

ART has also been used in field tests at Gassco's Kårstø facility.

In 2012, DNV's ART activities were spun out into a subsidiary, HalfWave, and was further developed through investment by Shell Technology Ventures, Chevron Technology Ventures, and Energy Ventures.

In 2020, Halfwave was acquired by Previan, who shared the technology between two of its business units, NDT Global, for its In-Line Inspection (ILI) solutions and TSC Subsea for subsea applications.

TSC Subsea has a long history of developing subsea inspection robotics, deploying multiple non-destructive testing (NDT) techniques. Since the merger, substantial enhancements have been made to the ART technology. As a result, Acoustic Resonance Technology has proven to penetrate thick subsea attenuative coatings of more than 100mm (4 inches).

TSC Subsea has successfully deployed ART with its Artemis solution to inspect subsea pipelines, flowlines, and flexible and rigid risers down to water depths of 3000m (10,000ft).

Most recently, many companies have been researching the ability of Artificial Intelligence (AI) to perform Acoustic Resonant Testing in order to eliminate the subjectivity that can arise through manual ART. By utilising an AI model to plot all of the points in a frequency spectrogram and compare bodies' spectrograms to one another, AI is able to identify even the slightest changes in material. In industries such as aerospace and military, the ability of AI to identify these minuscule anomalies is of utmost importance as missing them can result in dire consequences. Companies such as RESONIKS have worked towards patenting specific AI models which are extensively trained in locating structural defects.

== Main features ==
- Uses lower frequencies than ultrasonic testing
- Effective in gases and liquids (i.e. requires no liquid couplant)
- Can be used to characterize multi-layered media (e.g. pipelines with coatings)
- Can penetrate coatings
- Can measure inside and outside metal loss

== RUV (resonance ultrasonic vibrations) ==
In a closely related technique, the presence of cracks in a solid structure can be detected by looking for differences in resonance frequency, bandwidth and resonance amplitude compared to a nominally identical but non-cracked structure. This technique, called RUV (Resonance Ultrasonic Vibrations), has been developed for use in the photovoltaics industry by a group of researchers from the University of South Florida, Ultrasonic Technologies Inc. (Florida, US), and Isofoton S.A. (Spain). The method was able to detect mm-size cracks in as-cut and processed silicon wafers, as well as finished solar cells, with a total test time of under 2 seconds per wafer.
