= Non-contact ultrasound =

Testing method

Non-contact ultrasound (NCU) is a method of non-destructive testing where ultrasound is generated and used to test materials without the generating sensor making direct or indirect contact with the test material or test subject. Historically this has been difficult to do, as a typical transducer is very inefficient in air. Therefore, most conventional ultrasound methods require the use of some type of acoustic coupling medium in order to efficiently transmit the energy from the sensor to the test material. Couplant materials can range from gels or jets of water to direct solder bonds. However, in non-contact ultrasound, ambient air is the only acoustic coupling medium.

An electromagnetic acoustic transducer (EMAT), is a type of non-contact ultrasound that generates an ultrasonic pulse which reflects off the sample and induces an electric current in the receiver. This is interpreted by software and provides clues about the internal structure of the sample such as cracks or faults.

Research is continuing to improve traditional transducers by applying different plastics, elastomers, and other materials. The sensitivity of these devices continues to improve; a newly developed piezoelectric transducer can produce frequencies in the MHz that can easily propagate through even high acoustic impedance materials such as steel and dense ceramics.

Non-contact ultrasound allows some materials to be inspected which otherwise can't be inspected due to fear of contamination from couplants or water. In general non-contact ultrasound would facilitate testing of materials or components that are continuously rolled on a production line, in extremely hot environments, coated, oxidized, or otherwise difficult to physically contact. Methods for potential medical use are also being investigated

=== How it works ===
Non-contact ultrasound uses sound waves which are at frequencies above the range of human hearing. The waves travel through a material or tissue and will reflect off boundaries between different structures. By measuring the returning echoe,s you can get information about the thickness of the material, the structure of the material and any possible defects.

In conventional ultrasounds you've got a probe sitting directly on the surface, and you typically have a gel or a liquid on there to help the sound waves get from the probe to the surface. Non-contact ultrasound eliminates the need for that physical contact by using different methods to generate and receive the sound.

One approach is to use air-coupled transducers, which transmit and receive the ultrasound through the air. The other approach is to use a laser to generate the ultrasound and optical equipment to detect the returning vibrations from the material/tissue.

=== Medical Uses ===
Researchers are looking at the use of non-contact ultrasound for medical imaging and tissue assessment. Conventional medical ultrasound requires the probe to be in contact with the patient's skin, and this can be problematic when looking at burns, wounds, or other sensitive areas. A non-contact system would allow some of these examinations to be carried out without the probe having to be in contact with the patient.

In 2019 researchers demonstrated a fully non-contact laser ultrasound system capable of imaging living human tissue. It worked by using a pulsed laser to generate ultrasound at the skin surface and an optical detector to pick up returning vibrations. They were able to image structures beneath the skin in human volunteers (muscle boundaries, bone surfaces, etc). It was a demonstration of the potential of laser ultrasound for medical imaging with no contact.

A 2026 feasibility study looked at an air-coupled ultrasound transducers for skin assessment. The system was tested on tissue-mimicking phantoms and pig skin of varying degrees of thermal damage. It was able to produce images and measurements that enabled differentiation between stiffness and condition of the tissues. The study concluded that air-coupled ultrasound has potential for skin assessment without the need for direct contact.

These technologies are still in the research phase, and further work is required to establish their effectiveness and appropriateness for routine clinical use.
