= FMT =

FMT, or fmt, may refer to:

- Fecal microbiota transplant
- Finite model theory
- Fluorescent microthermography
- FMT, the Amtrak code for Fremont station, California, US
- FMT, the National Rail code for Falmouth Town railway station, Cornwall, UK
- fmt (Unix), a text formatter
- Forsvarets Materieltjeneste, the Danish Defence Material Service, now the Danish Defence Acquisition and Logistics Organization
- Free Malaysia Today, a Malaysian online newspaper
- "FMT" (song), by Summer Walker
