= Thermal imaging in ornithology =

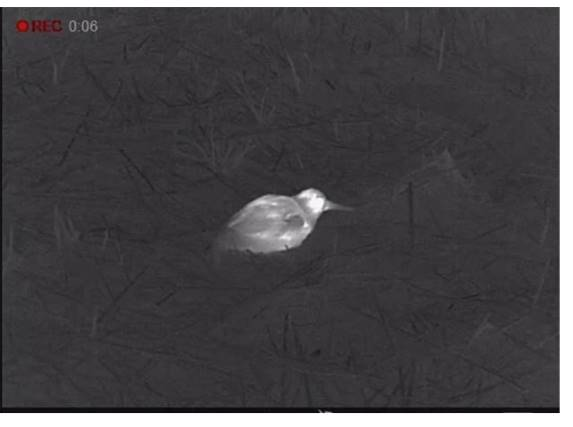
Thermal image of a Jack snipe (Lymnocryptes minimus), taken by the West Midlands Ringing Group

The use of thermal imaging devices to monitor birds began in the 1960s. It underwent significant development from the end of the 20th century onwards. This was, at least in part, due to improvements in the quality and portability of thermal-imaging devices, and reductions in their cost.

Although primarily a nocturnal activity, thermal imaging can also be used in daylight, for example monitoring Eurasian bittern (Botaurus stellaris) and water rail (Rallus aquaticus) in dense vegetation.

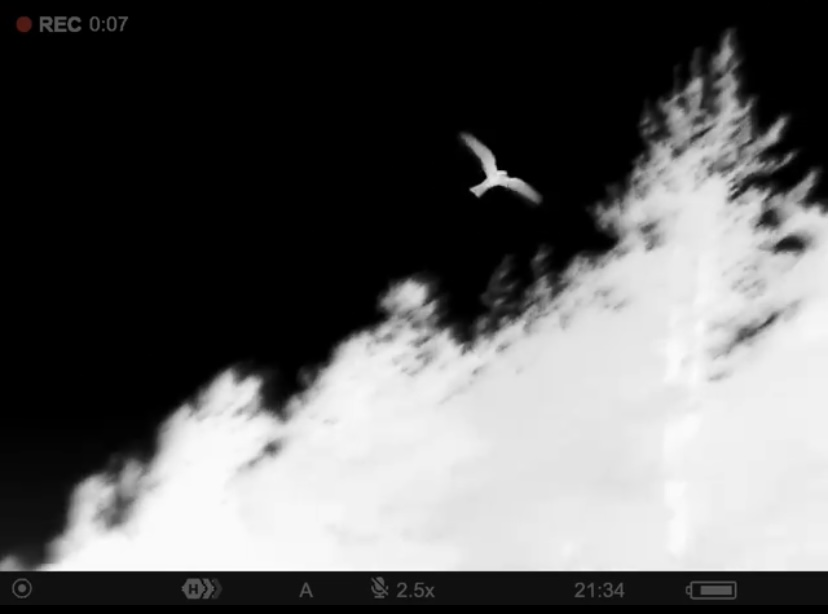
Thermal image of a European nightjar (Caprimulgus europaeus) in flight, on Cannock Chase, Staffordshire, England

One bird ringing organisation, the West Midlands Ringing Group (formerly Brewood Ringers), caught and rung 424 adult skylarks (Alauda arvensis) in 2019, using thermal imaging to locate them; this was 81.4% of the total caught Britain & Ireland that year. The group subsequently received the 2021 Marsh Award for Innovative Ornithology for their innovative use of thermal imaging technology in monitoring farmland birds. The group uses Pulsar Helion thermal imaging cameras and have determined that this not only helps them to find more birds, but reduces the disturbance caused to the birds, due to needing to spend less time in the field.

== Other taxa ==
Thermal imaging has also been used to monitor mammal species including bats, mice, and ungulates, and even the health of trees.
