= Non-contact thermography =

Thermography (medical)
- ICD-9: 88.8
- MeSH: D013817

Non-contact thermography, thermographic imaging, or medical thermology is the field of thermography that uses infrared images of the human skin to assist in the diagnosis and treatment of medical conditions. Medical thermology is sometimes referred to as medical infrared imaging or tele-thermology and utilizes thermographic cameras. According to the American Academy of Thermology, Medical Thermology practitioners are licensed health care practitioners who utilize IR imaging in consistent with medically established paradigms of care. Non-medically licensed alternative practitioners who are not held to the same standard may offer thermography services but that should not be confused with the field of medical thermology.

Restated, medical thermology is the use of infrared (IR) imaging to assess skin temperature as an extension of the clinician's physical exam to aid in the formation of a medical diagnosis or treatment plan. Medical Thermology does not condone those who purport that "Thermography" can find disease by looking for areas of the body that have abnormal heat or irregular blood flow. IR imaging simply does not have the ability to assess temperature beyond the surface of the skin.

Thermography is a physiologic study and is not a replacement for structural studies such as X-Ray, MRI, or Mammography. As a physiologic study, however, medical thermology has many health-related indications. The American Academy of Thermology (AAT) (www.aathermology.org) has published internationally peer-reviewed guidelines for neuro-musculoskeletal (MSK), breast, veterinary, and oral-systemic disease.

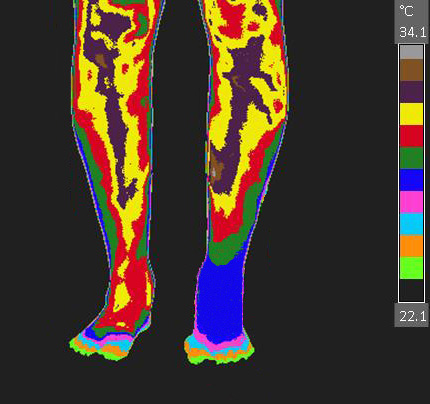
CRPS-RSD of the left foot imaged with medical thermology during a cold pressor test.

Examples of neuro-musculoskeletal indications for medical thermology include Reflex Sympathetic Dystrophy (RSD), Chronic Regional Pain Syndrome (CRPS), Dysautonomia, Migraine, Fibromyalgia (and other weather-sensitive pain syndromes), thoracic outlet syndrome, and vaso-motor migraine/headaches such as Barré-Liéou syndrome. This is especially true when used to monitor the results of a cold stress (cold presser) test.

Thermography is not effective for any type of medical screening, and the FDA had repeatedly issued warning letters to fraudsters claiming otherwise.

Veterinary thermography indications include, but are not limited to, assessment of shoring, limb inflammation, and sweating disorders.

Telethermography systems are regulated as a medical device under 21 CFR 884.2980.

== Medical Thermology versus Thermography ==
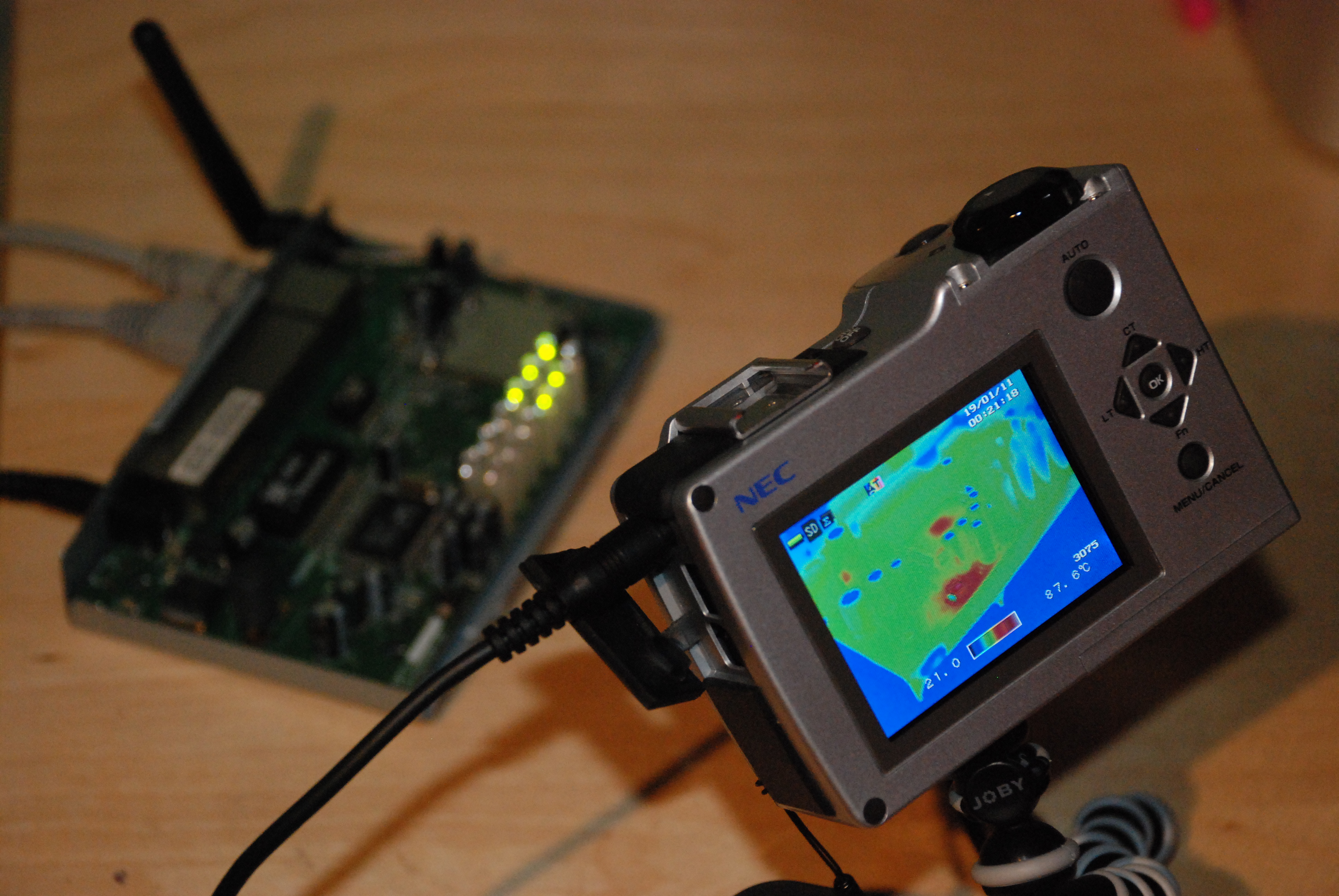
Sample image of a hand held thermography camera

There is a difference between Medical Thermology as promulgated by medically based organizations such as the American Academy of Thermology (AAT), and thermography as practiced by alternative providers or physicians who overstate the benefits of thermography. As a result of this disparity organizations such as the FDA, ISO, and the AAT have published Guidelines and best use practices to help educate medical providers and the public to recognize the difference between providers who provide medical thermology services and those that offer something else.

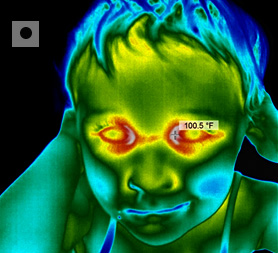
Infrared (IR) temperature measurement for fever screening correctly done at the medial canthus (tear duct) of the eye.

Thermography has been promoted by some alternative medicine practitioners as a means to diagnose cancer, although it is not effective for this purpose. Health Canada has issued "cease and desist" orders to clinics offering breast thermography as a cancer diagnostic device because thermography cameras are not licensed as a medical device in Canada, and because thermography for cancer detection is viewed as ineffective by medical experts. The FDA has issued a public warning notice stating that breast thermography is not an alternative to mammography and has ordered Joseph Mercola to stop making excessive claims for thermography.

Thermography is discouraged in North America by the American Cancer Society, radiologists and the FDA for early breast cancer detection. Advertisements in the United Kingdom have been found to be misleading.

The FDA has cleared thermography only as an adjunct method of screening. "Thermography devices have been cleared by the FDA for use as an adjunct, or additional, tool for detecting breast cancer." The FDA says it is not effective for any kind of medical screening. The AAT has published several Position Papers, including statements on Breast Thermography that clearly delineate its utility as an adjudicative breast risk health assessment only.

== See also ==
- Thermography
