= Thermography =

Infrared imaging used to reveal temperature

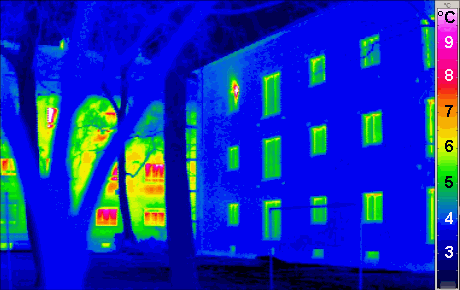
Thermogram of a traditional building in the background and a "passive house" in the foreground

Infrared thermography (IRT), also known as thermal imaging, is a measurement and imaging technique in which a thermal camera detects infrared radiation originating from the surface of objects. This radiation has two main components: thermal emission from the object's surface, which depends on its temperature and emissivity, and reflected radiation from surrounding sources. When the object is not (fully) opaque, i.e. exhibits nonzero transmissivity at the cameras operating wavelengths, transmitted radiation also contributes to the observed signal. The result is a visible image called a thermogram. Thermal cameras most commonly operate in the long-wave infrared (LWIR) range (7–14 μm); less frequently, systems designed for the mid-wave infrared (MWIR) range (3–5 μm) are used.

Since infrared radiation is emitted by all objects with a temperature above absolute zero according to the black body radiation law, thermography makes it possible to see one's environment with or without visible illumination. The amount of radiation emitted by an object increases with temperature, and thermography allows one to see variations in temperature. When viewed through a thermal imaging camera, warm objects stand out well against cooler backgrounds. For example, humans and other warm-blooded animals become easily visible against their environment in day or night. As a result, thermography is particularly useful to the military and other users of surveillance cameras.

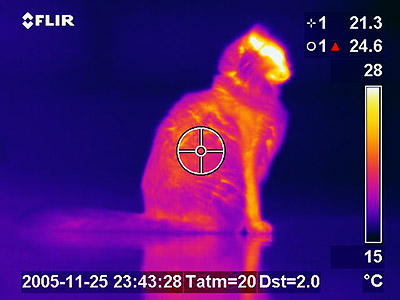
Thermogram of a cat

Some physiological changes in human beings and other warm-blooded animals can also be monitored with thermal imaging during clinical diagnostics. Thermography is used in allergy detection and veterinary medicine. Some alternative medicine practitioners promote its use for breast screening, despite the FDA warning that "those who opt for this method instead of mammography may miss the chance to detect cancer at its earliest stage". Notably, government and airport personnel used thermography to detect suspected swine flu cases during the 2009 pandemic.

Thermography has a long history, although its use has increased dramatically with the commercial and industrial applications of the past 50 years. Firefighters use thermography to see through smoke, to find persons, and to locate the base of a fire. Maintenance technicians use thermography to locate overheating joints and sections of power lines, which are a sign of impending failure. Building construction technicians can see thermal signatures that indicate heat leaks in faulty thermal insulation, improving the efficiency of heating and air-conditioning units.

The appearance and operation of a modern thermographic camera is often similar to a camcorder. Often the live thermogram reveals temperature variations so clearly that a photograph is not necessary for analysis. A recording module is therefore not always built-in.

Specialized thermal imaging cameras use focal plane arrays (FPAs) that respond to longer wavelengths (mid- and long-wavelength infrared). The most common types are InSb, InGaAs, HgCdTe and QWIP FPA. The newest technologies use low-cost, uncooled microbolometers as FPA sensors. Their resolution is considerably lower than that of optical cameras, mostly 160×120 or 320×240 pixels, and up to 1280 × 1024 for the most expensive models. Thermal imaging cameras are much more expensive than their visible-spectrum counterparts, and higher-end models are often export-restricted due to potential military uses. Older bolometers or more sensitive models such as InSb require cryogenic cooling, usually by a miniature Stirling cycle refrigerator or with liquid nitrogen.

== Thermal energy ==
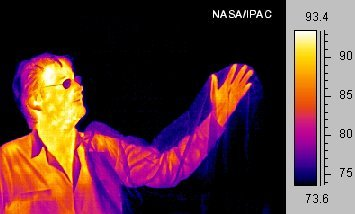
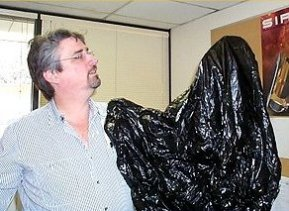
A comparison of a thermal image (top) and an ordinary photograph (bottom). The plastic bag is mostly transparent to long-wavelength infrared, but the man's glasses are opaque.

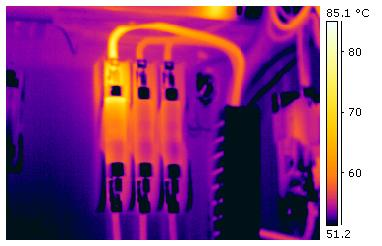
This thermogram shows excessive heating on a terminal in an industrial electrical fuse block.

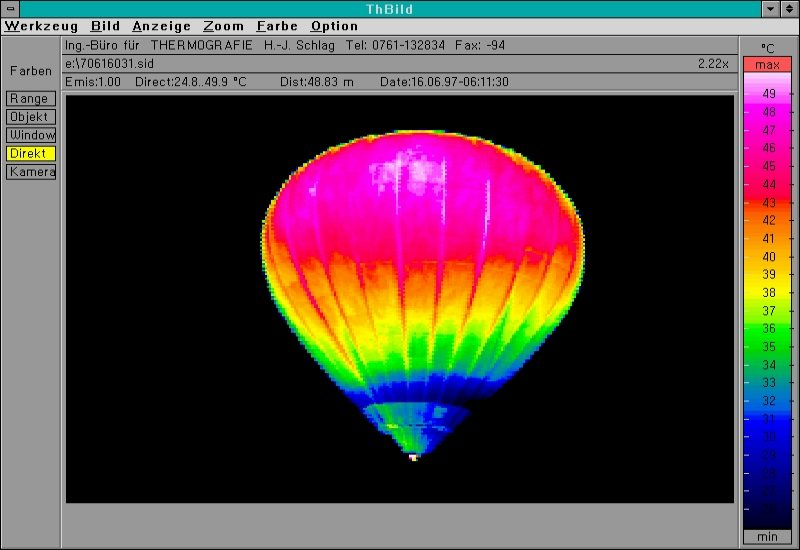
A thermal image showing temperature variation in a hot air balloon

Thermal images, or thermograms, are visual displays of the total infrared energy emitted, transmitted, and reflected by an object. Because there are multiple sources of the infrared energy, it is sometimes difficult to get an accurate temperature of an object using this method. A thermal imaging camera uses processing algorithms to reconstruct a temperature image. Note that the image shows an approximation of the temperature of an object, as the camera integrates multiple sources of data in the areas surrounding the object to estimate its temperature.

This phenomenon may become clearer upon consideration of the formula:

Incident Radiant Power = Emitted Radiant Power + Transmitted Radiant Power + Reflected Radiant Power;

where incident radiant power is the radiant power profile when viewed through a thermal imaging camera. Emitted radiant power is generally what is intended to be measured; transmitted radiant power is the radiant power that passes through the subject from a remote thermal source, and; reflected radiant power is the amount of radiant power that reflects off the surface of the object from a remote thermal source.

This phenomenon occurs everywhere, all the time. It is a process known as radiant heat exchange, since radiant power × time equals radiant energy. However, in the case of infrared thermography, the above equation is used to describe the radiant power within the spectral wavelength passband of the thermal imaging camera in use. The radiant heat exchange requirements described in the equation apply equally at every wavelength in the electromagnetic spectrum.

If the object is radiating at a higher temperature than its surroundings, then power transfer takes place radiating from warm to cold following the principle stated in the second law of thermodynamics. So if there is a cool area in the thermogram, that object will be absorbing radiation emitted by surrounding warm objects.

The ability of objects to emit is called emissivity, to absorb radiation is called absorptivity. Under outdoor environments, convective cooling from wind may also need to be considered when trying to get an accurate temperature reading.

== Emissivity ==
Emissivity (or emissivity coefficient) represents a material's ability to emit thermal radiation, which is an optical property of matter. A material's emissivity can theoretically range from 0 (completely not-emitting) to 1 (completely emitting). An example of a substance with low emissivity would be silver, with an emissivity coefficient of 0.02. An example of a substance with high emissivity would be asphalt, with an emissivity coefficient of .98.

A black body is a theoretical object with an emissivity of 1 that radiates thermal radiation characteristic of its contact temperature. That is, if the contact temperature of a thermally uniform black body radiator were 50 °C (122 °F), it would emit the characteristic black-body radiation of 50 °C (122 °F). An ordinary object emits less infrared radiation than a theoretical black body. In other words, the ratio of the actual emission to the maximum theoretical emission is an object's emissivity.

Each material has a different emissivity which may vary by temperature and infrared wavelength. For example, clean metal surfaces have emissivity that decreases at longer wavelengths; many dielectric materials, such as quartz (SiO_{2}), sapphire (Al_{2}O_{3}), calcium fluoride (CaF_{2}), etc. have emissivity that increases at longer wavelength; simple oxides, such as iron oxide (Fe_{2}O_{3}) display relatively flat emissivity in the infrared spectrum.

== Measurement ==
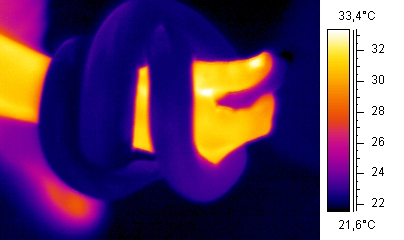
Thermogram of a snake held by a human

A thermal imaging camera performs radiometric processing to convert the detected infrared radiation into estimates of the object's surface temperature. This is achieved through the application of the thermography equation, which accounts for emitted and reflected components of radiation, as well as the influence of the atmosphere, which emits its own thermal radiation and attenuates the radiation originating from the measured surface. In the case of a radiometric thermal camera (the current standard), the output images contain not only visual information but also radiometric data that represent the detected radiation and allow accurate temperature evaluation based on the computational model provided by the thermography equation.

The spectrum and amount of thermal radiation depend strongly on an object's surface temperature. This enables thermal imaging of an object's temperature. However, other factors also influence the received radiation, which limits the accuracy of this technique: for example, the emissivity of the object.

For a non-contact temperature measurement, the emissivity setting needs to be set properly. An object of low emissivity could have its temperature underestimated by the detector, since it only detects emitted infrared rays. For a quick estimate, a thermographer may refer to an emissivity table for a given type of object, and enter that value into the imager. It would then calculate the object's contact temperature based on the entered emissivity and the infrared radiation as detected by the imager.

For a more accurate measurement, a thermographer may apply a standard material of known, high emissivity to the surface of the object. The standard material might be an industrial emissivity spray produced specifically for the purpose, or as simple as standard black insulation tape, with an emissivity of about 0.97. The object's known temperature can then be measured using the standard emissivity. If desired, the object's actual emissivity (on a part of the object not covered by the standard material) can be determined by adjusting the imager's setting to the known temperature. There are situations, however, when such an emissivity test is not possible due to dangerous or inaccessible conditions, then the thermographer must rely on tables.

Other variables can affect the measurement, including absorption and ambient temperature of the transmitting medium (usually air). Also, surrounding infrared radiation can be reflected in the object. All these settings will affect the calculated temperature of the object being viewed.

=== Color scale ===
Images from infrared cameras tend to be monochrome because the cameras generally use an image sensor that does not distinguish different wavelengths of infrared radiation. Color image sensors require a complex construction to differentiate wavelengths, and color has less meaning outside of the normal visible spectrum because the differing wavelengths do not map uniformly into the color vision system used by humans.

Sometimes these monochromatic images are displayed in pseudo-color, where changes in color are used rather than changes in intensity to display changes in the signal. This technique, called density slicing, is useful because although humans have much greater dynamic range in intensity detection than color overall, the ability to see fine intensity differences in bright areas is fairly limited.

In temperature measurement the brightest (warmest) parts of the image are customarily colored white, intermediate temperatures reds and yellows, and the dimmest (coolest) parts black. A scale should be shown next to a false color image to relate colors to temperatures.

== Cameras ==
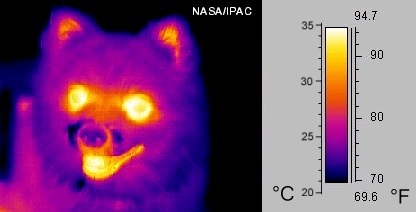
Image of a Pomeranian taken in mid-infrared ("thermal") light (false-color)

A thermographic camera (also called an infrared camera or thermal imaging camera, thermal camera or thermal imager) is a device that creates an image using infrared (IR) radiation, similar to a normal camera that forms an image using visible light. Instead of the 400–700 nanometre (nm) range of the visible light camera, infrared cameras are sensitive to wavelengths from about 1,000 nm (1 micrometre or μm) to about 14,000 nm (14 μm). The practice of capturing and analyzing the data they provide is called thermography.

Thermal cameras convert the energy in the far infrared wavelength into a visible light display. All objects above absolute zero emit thermal infrared energy, so thermal cameras can passively see all objects, regardless of ambient light. However, most thermal cameras are sensitive to objects warmer than −50 °C (−58 °F).

Some specification parameters of an infrared camera system are number of pixels, frame rate, responsivity, noise-equivalent power, noise-equivalent temperature difference (NETD), spectral band, distance-to-spot ratio (D:S), minimum focus distance, sensor lifetime, minimum resolvable temperature difference (MRTD), field of view, dynamic range, input power, and mass and volume.

Their resolution is considerably lower than that of optical cameras, often around 160×120 or 320×240 pixels, although more expensive ones can achieve a resolution of 1280×1024 pixels. Thermographic cameras are much more expensive than their visible-spectrum counterparts, though low-performance add-on thermal cameras for smartphones became available for hundreds of US dollars in 2014.

=== Types ===
Thermographic cameras can be broadly divided into two types: those with cooled infrared image detectors and those with uncooled detectors.

==== Cooled infrared detectors ====
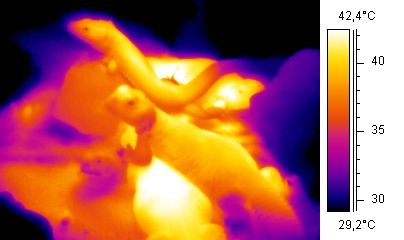
A thermographic image of several lizards

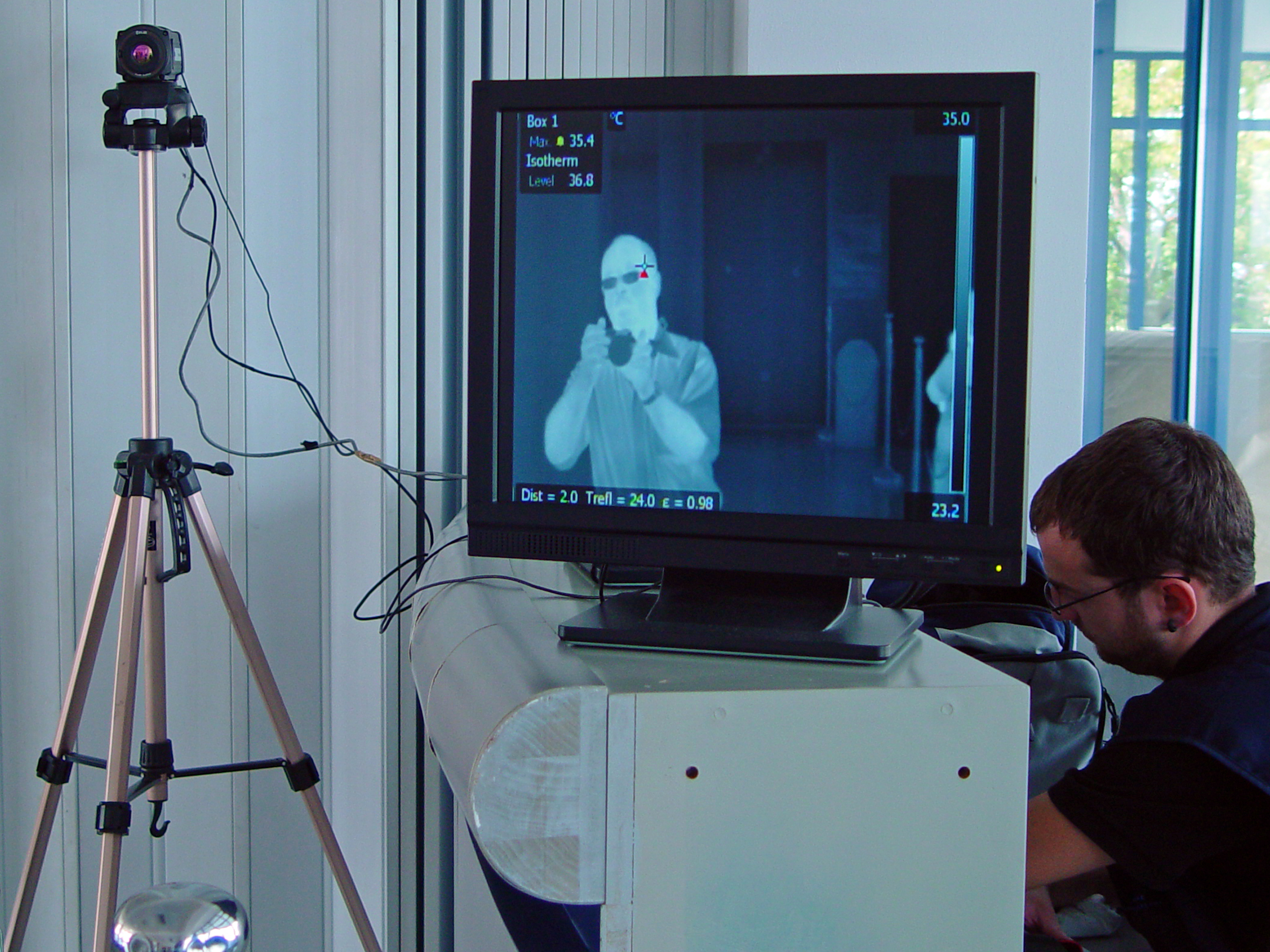
Thermal imaging camera & screen, in an airport terminal in Greece. Thermal imaging can detect fever, one of the signs of infection.

Cooled detectors are typically contained in a vacuum-sealed case or Dewar and cryogenically cooled. Cooling is necessary for the operation of the semiconductor materials used. Typical operating temperatures range from 4 K (−269 °C) to just below room temperature, depending on the detector technology. Most modern cooled detectors operate in the 60 Kelvin (K) to 100 K range (−213 to −173 °C), depending on type and performance level.

Without cooling, these sensors (which detect and convert light in much the same way as common digital cameras, but are made of different materials) would be 'blinded' or flooded by their own radiation. The drawbacks of cooled infrared cameras are that they are expensive both to produce and to run. Cooling is both energy-intensive and time-consuming.

The camera may need several minutes to cool down before it can begin working. The most commonly used cooling systems are peltier coolers which, although inefficient and limited in cooling capacity, are relatively simple and compact. To obtain better image quality or for imaging low temperature objects Stirling cryocoolers are needed. Although the cooling apparatus may be comparatively bulky and expensive, cooled infrared cameras provide greatly superior image quality compared to uncooled ones, particularly of objects near or below room temperature. Additionally, the greater sensitivity of cooled cameras also allow the use of higher F-number lenses, making high performance long focal length lenses both smaller and cheaper for cooled detectors.

An alternative to Stirling coolers is to use gases bottled at high pressure, nitrogen being a common choice. The pressurised gas is expanded via a micro-sized orifice and passed over a miniature heat exchanger resulting in regenerative cooling via the Joule–Thomson effect. For such systems the supply of pressurized gas is a logistical concern for field use.

Materials used for cooled infrared detection include photodetectors based on a wide range of narrow gap semiconductors including indium antimonide (3–5 μm), indium arsenide, mercury cadmium telluride (MCT) (1–2 μm, 3–5 μm, 8–12 μm), lead sulfide, and lead selenide. Infrared photodetectors can also be created with structures of high bandgap semiconductors such as in quantum well infrared photodetectors.

Cooled bolometer technologies can be superconducting or non-superconducting. Superconducting detectors offer extreme sensitivity, with some able to register individual photons. For example, ESA's Superconducting camera (SCAM). However, they are not in regular use outside of scientific research. In principle, superconducting tunneling junction devices could be used as infrared sensors because of their very narrow gap. Small arrays have been demonstrated, but they have not been broadly adopted for use because their high sensitivity requires careful shielding from background radiation.

==== Uncooled infrared detectors ====
Uncooled thermal cameras use a sensor operating at ambient temperature, or a sensor stabilized at a temperature close to ambient using small temperature control elements. Modern uncooled detectors all use sensors that work by the change of resistance, voltage or current when heated by infrared radiation. These changes are then measured and compared to the values at the operating temperature of the sensor.

In uncooled detectors the temperature differences at the sensor pixels are minute; a 1 °C difference at the scene induces just a 0.03 °C difference at the sensor. The pixel response time is also fairly slow, at the range of tens of milliseconds.

Uncooled infrared sensors can be stabilized to an operating temperature to reduce image noise, but they are not cooled to low temperatures and do not require bulky, expensive, energy consuming cryogenic coolers. This makes infrared cameras smaller and less costly. However, their resolution and image quality tend to be lower than cooled detectors. This is due to differences in their fabrication processes, limited by currently available technology. An uncooled thermal camera also needs to deal with its own heat signature.

Uncooled detectors are mostly based on pyroelectric and ferroelectric materials or microbolometer technology. The material are used to form pixels with highly temperature-dependent properties, which are thermally insulated from the environment and read electronically.

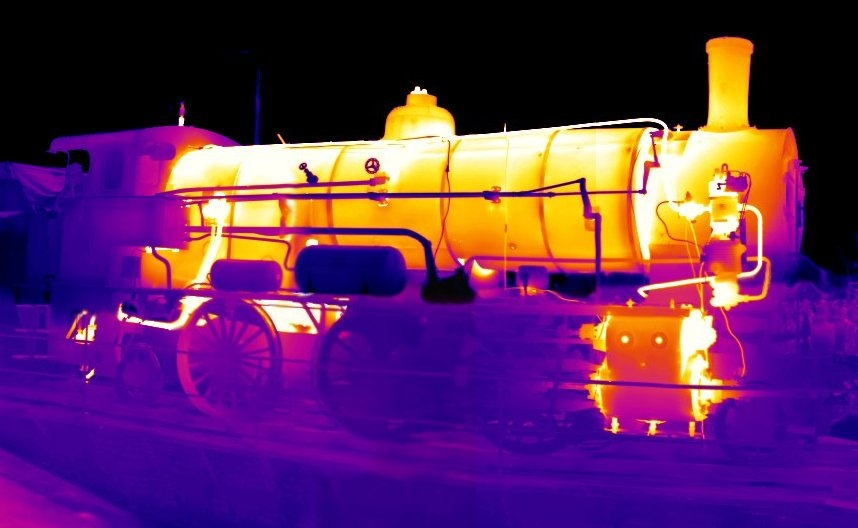
Thermal image of steam locomotive

Ferroelectric detectors operate close to phase transition temperature of the sensor material; the pixel temperature is read as the highly temperature-dependent polarization charge. The achieved NETD of ferroelectric detectors with f/1 optics and 320×240 sensors is 70–80 mK. A possible sensor assembly consists of barium strontium titanate bump-bonded by polyimide thermally insulated connection.

Silicon microbolometers can reach NETD down to 20 mK. They consist of a layer of amorphous silicon, or a thin film vanadium(V) oxide sensing element suspended on silicon nitride bridge above the silicon-based scanning electronics. The electric resistance of the sensing element is measured once per frame.

Current improvements of uncooled focal plane arrays (UFPA) are focused primarily on higher sensitivity and pixel density. In 2013 DARPA announced a five-micron LWIR camera that uses a 1280 × 720 focal plane array (FPA). Some of the materials used for the sensor arrays are amorphous silicon (a-Si), vanadium(V) oxide (VOx), lanthanum barium manganite (LBMO), lead zirconate titanate (PZT), lanthanum doped lead zirconate titanate (PLZT), lead scandium tantalate (PST), lead lanthanum titanate (PLT), lead titanate (PT), lead zinc niobate (PZN), lead strontium titanate (PSrT), barium strontium titanate (BST), barium titanate (BT), antimony sulfoiodide (SbSI), and polyvinylidene difluoride (PVDF).

=== CCD and CMOS thermography ===
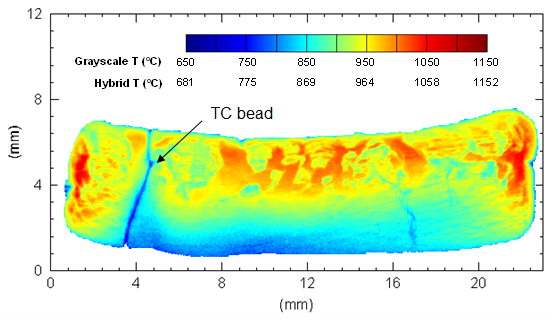
Color contours of temperature for a smoldering ember measured with a CMOS camera.

Non-specialized charge-coupled device (CCD) and CMOS sensors have most of their spectral sensitivity in the visible light wavelength range. However, by utilizing the "trailing" area of their spectral sensitivity, namely the part of the infrared spectrum called near-infrared (NIR), and by using off-the-shelf CCTV camera it is possible under certain circumstances to obtain true thermal images of objects with temperatures at about 280 °C (536 °F) and higher.

At temperatures of 600 °C and above, inexpensive cameras with CCD and CMOS sensors have also been used for pyrometry in the visible spectrum. They have been used for soot in flames, burning coal particles, heated materials, SiC filaments, and smoldering embers. This pyrometry has been performed using external filters or only the sensor's Bayer filters. It has been performed using color ratios, grayscales, and/or a hybrid of both.

=== Infrared films ===
Infrared (IR) film is sensitive to black-body radiation in the 250 to 500 °C (482 to 932 °F) range, while the range of thermography is approximately −50 to 2,000 °C (−58 to 3,632 °F). So, for an IR film to work thermographically, the measured object must be over 250 °C (482 °F) or be reflecting infrared radiation from something that is at least that hot.

=== Comparison with night-vision devices ===
Starlight-type night-vision devices generally only magnify ambient light and are not thermal imagers.

Some infrared cameras marketed as night vision are sensitive to near-infrared just beyond the visual spectrum, and can see emitted or reflected near-infrared in complete visual darkness. However, these are not usually used for thermography due to the high equivalent black-body temperature required, but are instead used with active near-IR illumination sources.

== Passive vs. active thermography ==
All objects above the absolute zero temperature (0 K) emit infrared radiation. Hence, an excellent way to measure thermal variations is to use an infrared sensing device, usually a focal plane array (FPA) infrared camera capable of detecting radiation in the mid (3 to 5 μm) and long (7 to 14 μm) wave infrared bands, denoted as MWIR and LWIR, corresponding to two of the high transmittance infrared windows. Abnormal temperature profiles at the surface of an object are an indication of a potential problem.

In passive thermography, the features of interest are naturally at a higher or lower temperature than the background. Passive thermography has many applications such as surveillance of people on a scene and medical diagnosis (specifically thermology).

In active thermography, an energy source is required to produce a thermal contrast between the feature of interest and the background. The active approach is necessary in many cases given that the inspected parts are usually in equilibrium with the surroundings. Given the super-linearities of the black-body radiation, active thermography can also be used to enhance the resolution of imaging systems beyond their diffraction limit or to achieve super-resolution microscopy.

== Advantages ==
Thermography shows a visual picture so temperatures over a large area can be compared. It is capable of catching moving targets in real time. It is able to find deterioration, i.e., higher temperature components prior to their failure. It can be used to measure or observe in areas inaccessible or hazardous for other methods. It is a non-destructive test method. It can be used to find defects in shafts, pipes, and other metal or plastic parts. It can be used to detect objects in dark areas. It has some medical application, essentially in physiotherapy.

== Limitations and disadvantages ==
Quality thermography cameras often have a high price (often US$3,000 or more) due to the expense of the larger pixel array (state of the art 2560x2048), although less expensive models (with pixel arrays of 40×40 up to 160×120 pixels) are also available. Fewer pixels compared to traditional cameras reduce the image quality making it more difficult to distinguish proximate targets within the same field of view.

There is also a difference in refresh rate. Some cameras may only have a refreshing value of 5 –15 Hz, other (e.g. FLIR X8500sc) 180 Hz or even more in no full window mode.

There are various types of lenses available, including fixed focus, manual focus, and auto focus. Most thermal cameras only support digital zoom and lack true optical zoom capabilities. However, a few models (e.g. FOTRIC P7MiX) offer dual-view optical zoom, combining lenses with different fields of view (e.g., 25° and 12°, or 25° and 7°).

Many models do not provide the irradiance measurements used to construct the output image; the loss of this information without a correct calibration for emissivity, distance, and ambient temperature and relative humidity entails that the resultant images are inherently incorrect measurements of temperature.

Images can be difficult to interpret accurately when based upon certain objects, specifically objects with erratic temperatures, although this problem is reduced in active thermal imaging.

Thermographic cameras create thermal images based on the radiant heat energy it receives. As radiation levels are influenced by the emissivity and reflection of radiation such as sunlight from the surface being measured this causes errors in the measurements.

- Most cameras have ±2% accuracy or worse in measurement of temperature and are not as accurate as contact methods.
- Methods and instruments are limited to directly detecting surface temperatures.

== Applications ==
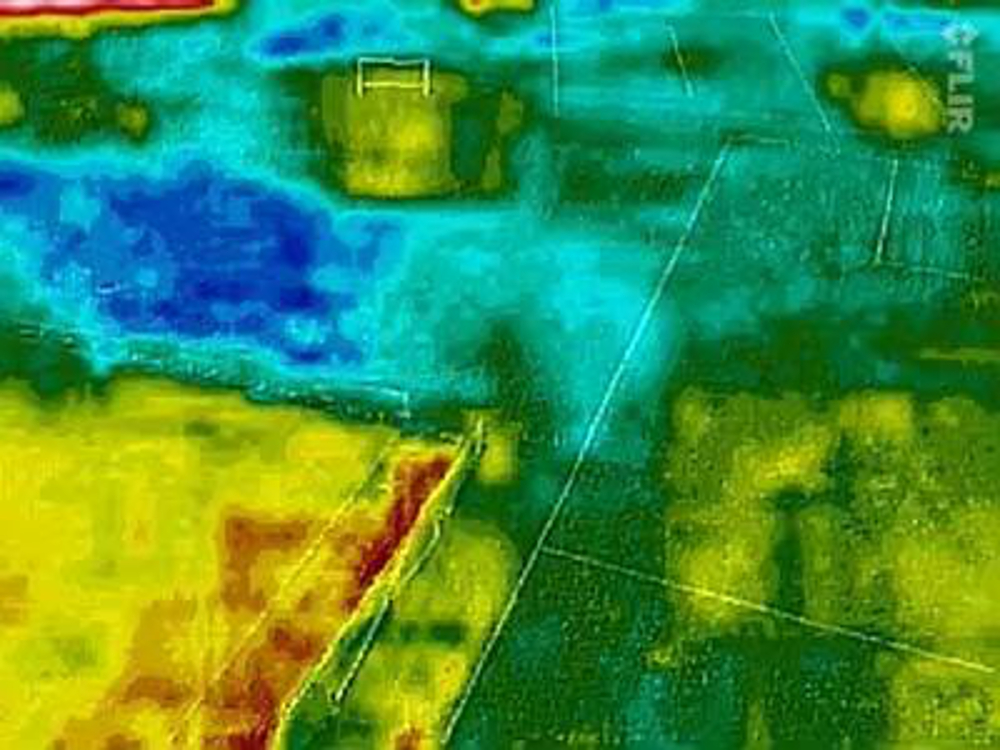
Kite aerial thermogram revealing features on/under a grassed playing field.

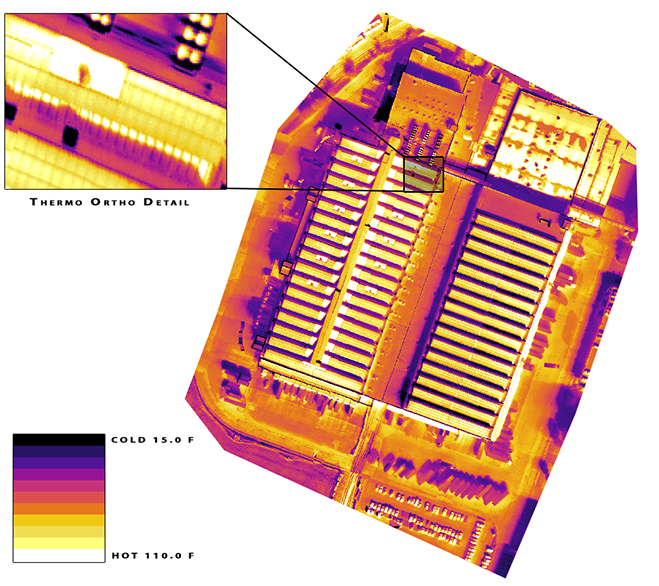
UAS thermal imagery of a solar panel array in Switzerland

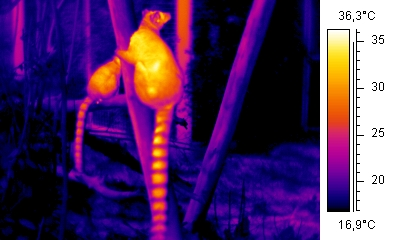
Thermographic image of a ring-tailed lemur

Thermography finds many uses, and thermal imaging cameras are excellent tools for the maintenance of electrical and mechanical systems in industry and commerce. For example, firefighters use it to see through smoke, find people, and localize hotspots of fires. Power line maintenance technicians locate overheating joints and parts, a telltale sign of their failure, to eliminate potential hazards. Where thermal insulation becomes faulty, building construction technicians can see heat leaks to improve the efficiencies of cooling or heating air-conditioning.

By using proper camera settings, electrical systems can be scanned and problems can be found. Faults with steam traps in steam heating systems are easy to locate.

In the energy savings area, thermal imaging cameras can see the effective radiation temperature of an object as well as what that object is radiating towards, which can help locate sources of thermal leaks and overheated regions.

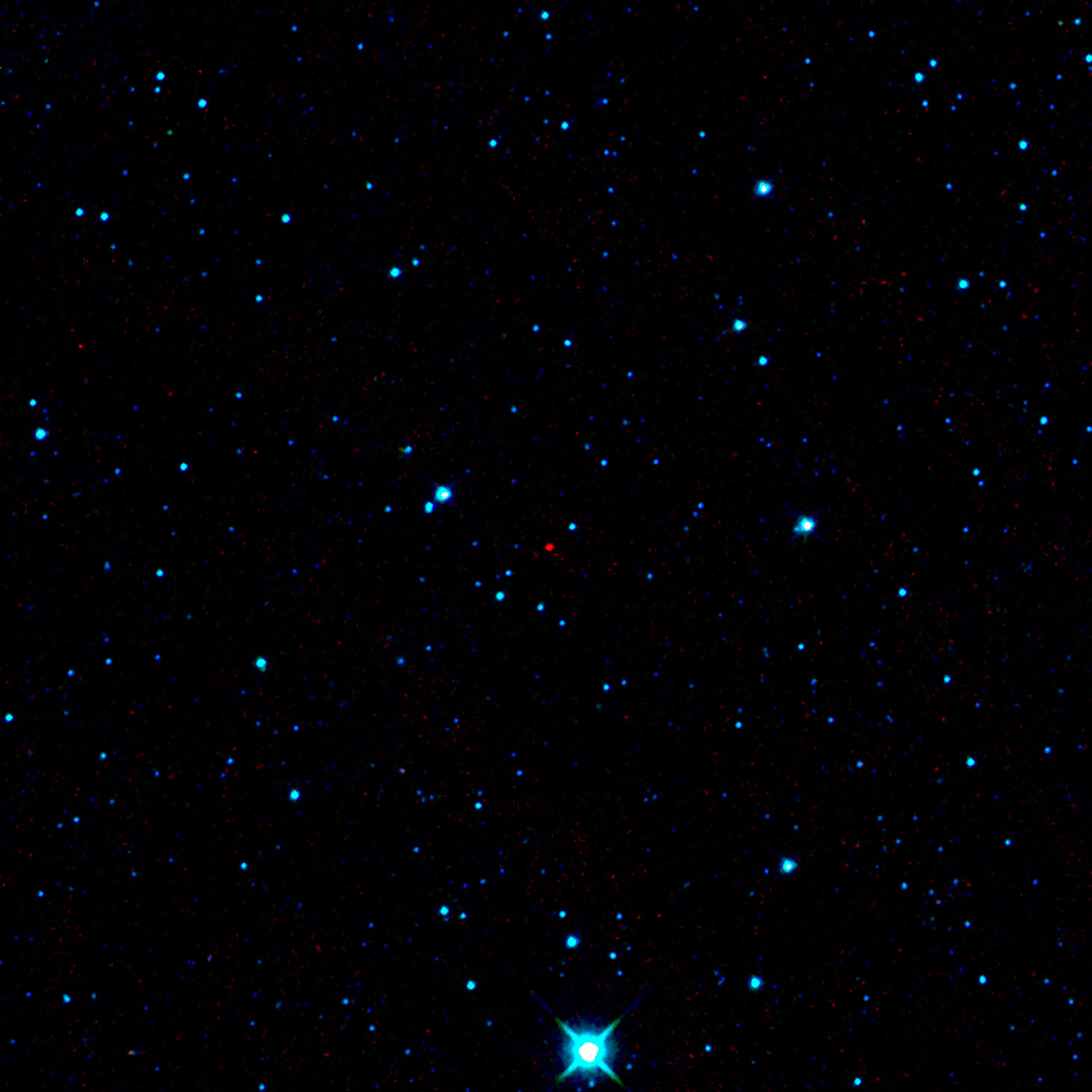
Viewed from space by WISE using a thermal camera, asteroid 2010 AB78 appears redder than the background stars as it emits most of its light at longer infrared wavelengths. In visible light and near-infrared it is very faint and difficult to see.

Cooled infrared cameras can be found at major astronomy research telescopes, even those that are not infrared telescopes. Examples include telescopes such as UKIRT, the Spitzer Space Telescope, WISE and the James Webb Space Telescope

For automotive night vision, thermal imaging cameras are also installed in some luxury cars to aid the driver, the first being the 2000 Cadillac DeVille.

In smartphones, a thermal camera was first integrated into the Cat S60 in 2016.

=== Industry ===
In manufacturing, engineering and research, thermography can be used for:

- Process control
- Research and development of new products
- Condition monitoring
- Electrical distribution equipment diagnosis and maintenance, such as transformer yards and distribution panels
- Nondestructive testing
- Fault diagnosis and troubleshooting
- Program process monitoring
- Quality control in production environments
- Predictive maintenance (early failure warning) on mechanical and electrical equipment
- Data center monitoring
- Inspecting photovoltaic power plants

In building inspection, thermography can be used in:

- Roof inspection, such as for low slope and flat roofing
- Building diagnostics, including building envelope inspections, and energy losses in buildings
- Locating pest infestations
- Energy auditing of building insulation and detection of refrigerant leaks
- Home performance
- Moisture detection in walls and roofs (and thus in turn often part of mold remediation)
- Masonry wall structural analysis

=== Health ===
Some physiological activities, particularly responses such as fever, in human beings and other warm-blooded animals can also be monitored with non-contact thermography. This can be compared to contact thermography such as with traditional thermometers.

Healthcare-related uses include:

- Dynamic angiothermography
- Peripheral vascular disease screening.
- Medical imaging in infrared
- Thermography (medical) – Medical testing for diagnosis
- Carotid artery stenosis (CAS) screening through skin thermal maps.
- Active Dynamic Thermography (ADT) for medical applications.
- Neuromusculoskeletal disorders.
- Extracranial cerebral and facial vascular disease.
- Facial emotion recognition.
- Thyroid gland abnormalities.
- Various other neoplastic, metabolic, and inflammatory conditions.

=== Security and defence ===
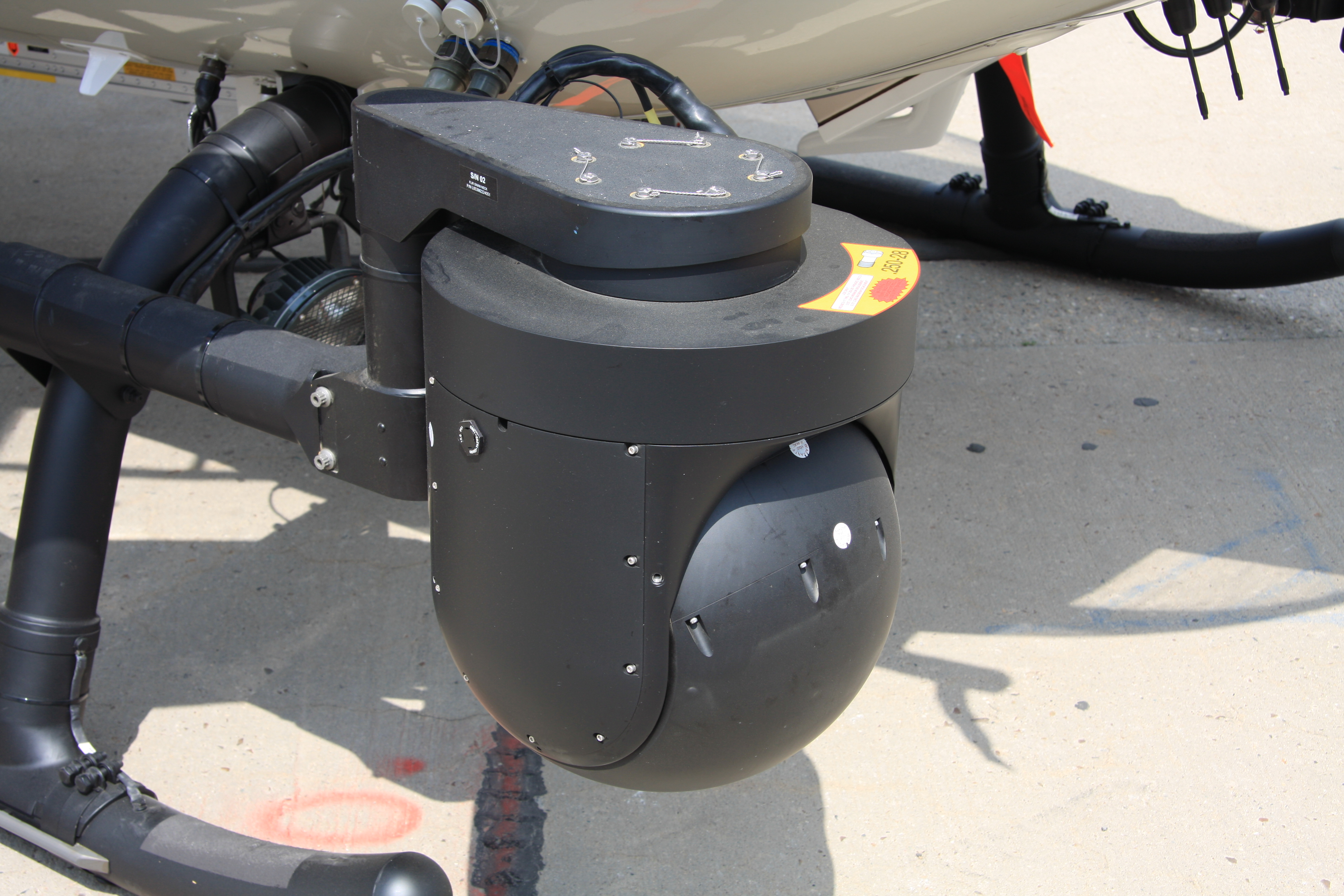
The thermographic camera on a Eurocopter EC135 helicopter of the German Federal Police

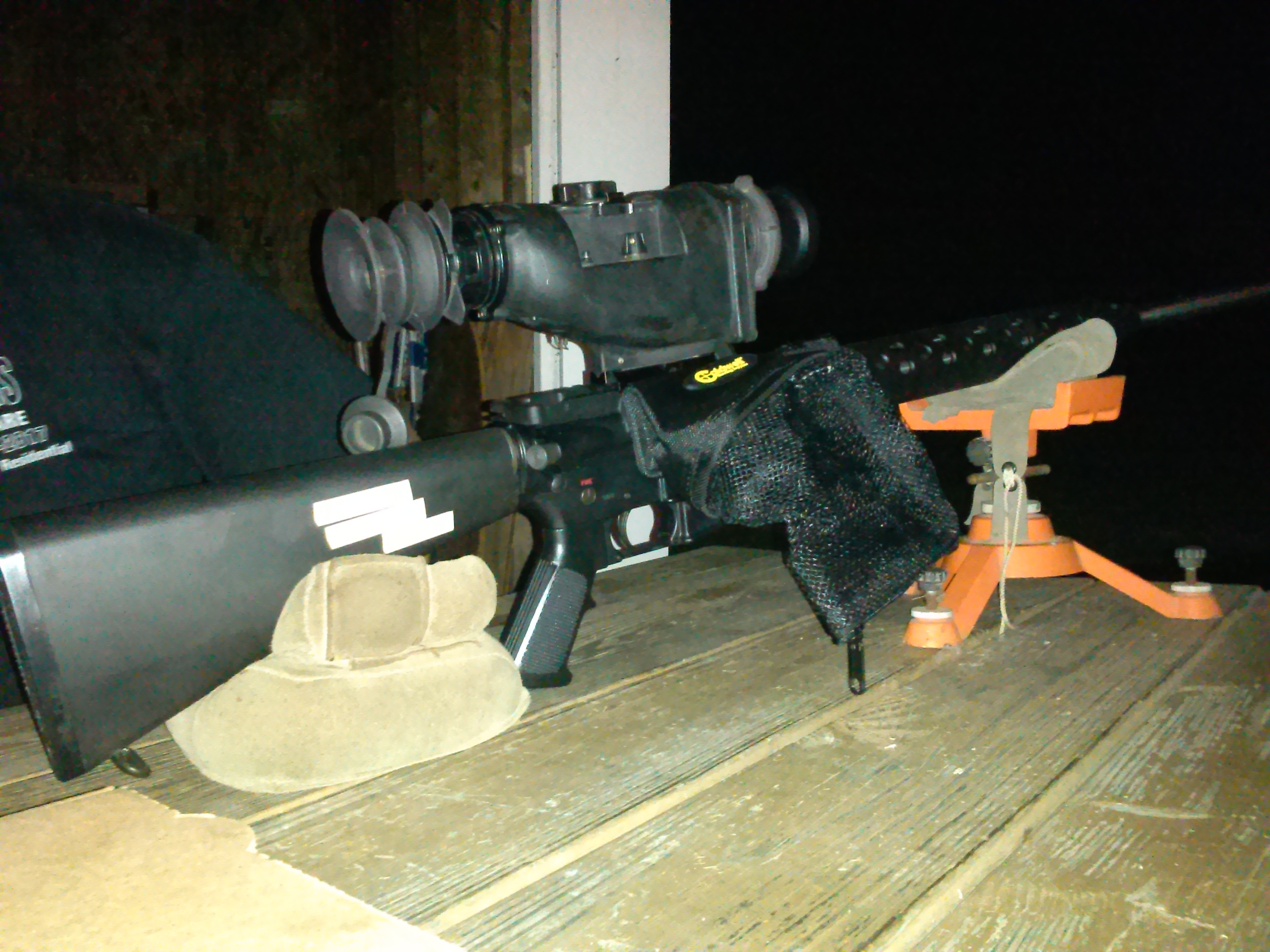
AN/PAS-13 thermal rifle scope mounted on an AR-15 rifle

Thermography is often used in surveillance, security, firefighting, law enforcement, and anti-terrorism:

- Quarantine monitoring of visitors to a country
- Technical surveillance counter-measures
- Search and rescue operations
- Firefighting operations
- UAV surveillance

In weapons systems, thermography can be used in military and police target detection and acquisition:

- Forward-looking infrared
- Infrared search and track
- Night vision
- Infrared targeting
- Thermal weapon sight

In computer hacking, a thermal attack is an approach that exploits heat traces left after interacting with interfaces, such as touchscreens or keyboards, to uncover the user's input.

=== Other applications ===
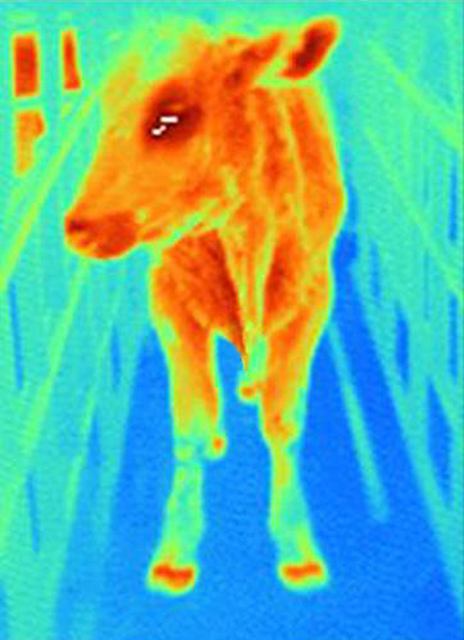
Hot hooves indicate a sick cow.

Other areas in which these techniques are used:

- Thermal mapping
- Archaeological kite aerial thermography
- Thermology
- Veterinary thermal imaging
- Thermal imaging in ornithology and other wildlife monitoring
- Nighttime wildlife photography
- Search and rescue where rescuers can find targets in zero visibility (night, smoke, fog), via ground and drone usage.
- Stereo vision
- Chemical imaging
- Volcanology
- Agriculture, e.g., Seed-counting machine
- Baby monitoring systems
- Chemical imaging
- Pollution effluent detection
- Aerial archaeology
- Flame detector
- Meteorology (thermal images from weather satellites are used to determine cloud temperature/height and water vapor concentrations, depending on the wavelength)
- Cricket Umpire Decision Review System. To detect faint contact of the ball with the bat (and hence a heat patch signature on the bat after contact).
- Autonomous navigation

== Standards ==
ASTM International (ASTM)

- ASTM C1060, Standard Practice for Thermographic Inspection of Insulation Installations in Envelope Cavities of Frame Buildings
- ASTM C1153, Standard Practice for the Location of Wet Insulation in Roofing Systems Using Infrared Imaging
- ATSM D4788, Standard Test Method for Detecting Delamination in Bridge Decks Using Infrared Thermography
- ASTM E1186, Standard Practices for Air Leakage Site Detection in Building Envelopes and Air Barrier Systems
- ASTM E1934, Standard Guide for Examining Electrical and Mechanical Equipment with Infrared Thermography

International Organization for Standardization (ISO)

- ISO 6781, Thermal insulation – Qualitative detection of thermal irregularities in building envelopes – Infrared method
- ISO 18434-1, Condition monitoring and diagnostics of machines – Thermography – Part 1: General procedures
- ISO 18436-7, Condition monitoring and diagnostics of machines – Requirements for qualification and assessment of personnel – Part 7: Thermography

=== Regulation ===
Higher-end thermographic cameras are often deemed dual-use military grade equipment, and are export-restricted, particularly if the resolution is 640×480 or greater, unless the refresh rate is 9 Hz or less. The export from the USA of specific thermal cameras is regulated by International Traffic in Arms Regulations.

== In biology ==
Thermography, by strict definition, is a measurement using an instrument, but some living creatures have natural organs that function as counterparts to bolometers, and thus possess a crude type of thermal imaging capability. This is called thermoception. One of the best known examples is infrared sensing in snakes.

== History ==
=== Discovery and research of infrared radiation ===
Infrared was discovered in 1800 by Sir William Herschel as a form of radiation beyond red light. These "infrared rays" (infra is the Latin prefix for "below") were used mainly for thermal measurement. There are four basic laws of IR radiation: Kirchhoff's law of thermal radiation, Stefan–Boltzmann law, Planck's law, and Wien's displacement law. The development of detectors was mainly focused on the use of thermometers and bolometers until World War I. A significant step in the development of detectors occurred in 1829, when Leopoldo Nobili, using the Seebeck effect, created the first known thermocouple, fabricating an improved thermometer, a crude thermopile. He described this instrument to Macedonio Melloni. Initially, they jointly developed a greatly improved instrument. Subsequently, Melloni worked alone, creating an instrument in 1833 (a multielement thermopile) that could detect a person 10 metres away. The next significant step in improving detectors was the bolometer, invented in 1880 by Samuel Pierpont Langley. Langley and his assistant Charles Greeley Abbot continued to make improvements in this instrument. By 1901, it could detect radiation from a cow from 400 metres away and was sensitive to differences in temperature of one hundred thousandths (0.00001 C) of a degree Celsius. The first commercial thermal imaging camera was sold in 1965 for high voltage power line inspections.

The first civil sector application of IR technology may have been a device to detect the presence of icebergs and steamships using a mirror and thermopile, patented in 1913. This was soon outdone by the first accurate IR iceberg detector, which did not use thermopiles, patented in 1914 by R.D. Parker. This was followed by G.A. Barker's proposal to use the IR system to detect forest fires in 1934. The technique was not genuinely industrialized until it was used to analyze heating uniformity in hot steel strips in 1935.

=== First thermographic camera ===
In 1929, Hungarian physicist Kálmán Tihanyi invented the infrared-sensitive (night vision) electronic television camera for anti-aircraft defense in Britain. The first American thermographic camera developed was an infrared line scanner. This was created by the US military and Texas Instruments in 1947 and took one hour to produce a single image. While several approaches were investigated to improve the speed and accuracy of the technology, one of the most crucial factors dealt with scanning an image, which the AGA company was able to commercialize using a cooled photoconductor.

The first British infrared linescan system was Yellow Duckling of the mid-1950s. This used a continuously rotating mirror and detector, with Y-axis scanning by the motion of the carrier aircraft. Although unsuccessful in its intended application of submarine tracking by wake detection, it was applied to land-based surveillance and became the foundation of military IR linescan.

This work was further developed at the Royal Signals and Radar Establishment in the UK when they discovered that mercury cadmium telluride was a photoconductor that required much less cooling. Honeywell in the United States also developed arrays of detectors that could cool at a lower temperature, but they scanned mechanically. This method had several disadvantages which could be overcome using an electronic scanning system. In 1969 Michael Francis Tompsett at English Electric Valve Company in the UK patented a camera that scanned pyro-electronically and which reached a high level of performance after several other breakthroughs during the 1970s. Tompsett also proposed an idea for solid-state thermal-imaging arrays, which eventually led to modern hybridized single-crystal-slice imaging devices.

By using video camera tubes such as vidicons with a pyroelectric material such as triglycine sulfate (TGS) as their targets, a vidicon sensitive over a broad portion of the infrared spectrum is possible. This technology was a precursor to modern microbolometer technology, and mainly used in firefighting thermal cameras.

=== Smart sensors ===
One of the essential areas of development for security systems was for the ability to intelligently evaluate a signal, as well as warning of a threat's presence. Under the encouragement of the US Strategic Defense Initiative, "smart sensors" began to appear. These are sensors that could integrate sensing, signal extraction, processing, and comprehension. There are two main types of smart sensors. One, similar to what is called a "vision chip" when used in the visible range, allow for preprocessing using smart sensing techniques due to the increase in growth of integrated microcircuitry. The other technology is more oriented to specific use and fulfills its preprocessing goal through its design and structure.

Towards the end of the 1990s, the use of infrared was moving towards civilian use. There was a dramatic lowering of costs for uncooled arrays, which along with the significant increase in developments, led to a dual-use market encompassing both civilian and military uses. These uses include environmental control, building/art analysis, functional medical diagnostics, and car guidance and collision avoidance systems.

== See also ==
- ASTM Subcommittee E20.02 on Radiation Thermometry
- Chemical imaging – Simultaneous measurement of spectra and pictures
- Fluorescent microthermography
- Hyperspectral imaging – Multi-wavelength imaging method
- Infrared and thermal testing
- Infrared non-destructive testing of materials – Materials testing procedure
- Infrared detector – Detector that reacts to infrared (IR) radiation
- Infrared photography – Near-infrared imaging
- Infrared thermometer – Thermometer which infers temperature by measuring infrared energy emission
- Night vision – Ability to see in low light conditions
- Non-contact thermography
- Ora (film)
- Passive infrared sensor – Electronic sensor that measures infrared light
- Sakuma–Hattori equation – Formula for the thermal radiation emitted by a perfect black body
- Thermal imaging camera (firefighting) – Thermal imaging camera in firefighting
- Thermographic inspection
