= Fluorescent microthermography =

Fluorescent microthermography (FMT) is a microscopy technique for infrared imaging of temperature distribution on a small scale. It can achieve a spatial resolution of half a micrometer and a temperature resolution of 0.005 K. Time-dependent measurements are possible, as the fluorescence lifetime is only about 200 microseconds.

A thin film of a phosphor, europium thenoyl-trifluoroacetonate, is applied on the surface (e.g. an integrated circuit die) and illuminated by ultraviolet light at 340–380 nm, stimulating fluorescence at mainly 612 nm line. The quantum efficiency of fluorescence decreases exponentially with temperature, differences in emitted light intensity can be therefore used to assess differences on surface temperature, with hot areas showing as darker.
