= Jean Hoerni =

Swiss–American physicist (1924–1997)

- Born: Jean Amédée Hoerni; September 26, 1924; Geneva, Switzerland
- Died: January 12, 1997 (aged 72); Seattle, Washington, U.S.
- Education: University of Geneva: Lic., Mathematics; Dr ès sc., Physics; University of Cambridge: PhD, Physics
- Known for: Invention of the planar process
- Spouses: Anne Marie Hoerni; Ruth Carmona; Jennifer Wilson
- Children: 3
- Awards: John Scott Award (1966); W. Wallace McDowell Award (1972)
- Scientific career
- Fields: Physics
- Workplaces: Shockley Semiconductor Laboratory; Fairchild Semiconductor; Teledyne; Intersil
- Thesis: Application de la diffraction électronique à l'étude de la structure du graphite (1950)
- Doctoral advisor: Richard Extermann

Jean Amédée Hoerni (September 26, 1924 – January 12, 1997) was a Swiss–American physicist. He was a silicon transistor pioneer and a member of the "traitorous eight". He developed the planar process, an important technology for reliably fabricating and manufacturing semiconductor devices, such as transistors and integrated circuits.

== Biography ==
Jean Amédée Hoerni was born on September 26, 1924, in Geneva, Switzerland. He attended the University of Geneva, where he received a licentiate in Mathematics in 1947 and a doctorate in Physics in 1950. He earned a second doctorate in Physics in 1952 from the University of Cambridge.

In 1952, Hoerni moved to the United States and became a postdoctoral fellow at the California Institute of Technology, where he worked within a research group led by Linus Pauling. In 1956, William Shockley recruited Hoerni to work with him at the newly-founded Shockley Semiconductor Laboratory. But Shockley's strange behavior compelled the so-called "traitorous eight" (Hoerni, Julius Blank, Victor Grinich, Eugene Kleiner, Jay Last, Gordon Moore, Robert Noyce, and Sheldon Roberts) to leave his laboratory the following year and form Fairchild Semiconductor.

In 1961, Hoerni left Fairchild to co-found Amelco Semiconductor, a division of Teledyne. Between 1964 and 1966, he worked as an engineering consultant for the Hughes Aircraft Company and Union Carbide Electronics. In 1967, he founded Intersil, a company that specialized in CMOS circuits for battery-powered devices, including electronic watches.

== Research ==
In 1955, Carl Frosch and Lincoln Derrick discovered and patented surface passivation by silicon dioxide. Frosch and Derrick were able to manufacture the first silicon dioxide field effect transistors, the first transistors in which drain and source were adjacent at the surface. At Shockley Semiconductor, Shockley had circulated the preprint of their article in December 1956 to all his senior staff, including Jean Hoerni. Later, Hoerni attended a meeting where Atalla presented a paper about passivation based on the previous results at Bell Labs.

The planar process was invented by Jean Hoerni, with his first patent filed in May 1959, while working at Fairchild Semiconductor. The planar process was critical in the invention of silicon integrated circuit by Robert Noyce. Noyce built on Hoerni's work with his conception of an integrated circuit, which added a layer of metal to the top of Hoerni's basic structure to connect different components, such as transistors, capacitors, or resistors, located on the same piece of silicon. The planar process provided a powerful way of implementing an integrated circuit that was superior to earlier conceptions of the device. With Noyce, Jack Kilby from Texas Instruments is usually credited with the invention of the integrated circuit, but Kilby's IC was based on germanium.

== Personal life and death ==
He was married to Anne Marie Hoerni and had three children: Annie Blackwell, Susan Killham, and Michael Hoerni. He had one brother, Marc Hoerni. His second marriage to Ruth Carmona also ended in divorce. Hoerni married Jennifer Wilson in 1993.

Hoerni died of myelofibrosis on January 12, 1997, in Seattle, Washington. He was 72.

== Philanthropy ==
An avid mountain climber, Hoerni often visited the Karakoram Mountains in Pakistan and was moved by the poverty of the Balti mountain people who lived there. He contributed $12,000, to Greg Mortenson's project to build a school in the remote village of Korphe, and later founded the Central Asia Institute with an endowment of $1 million to continue providing services for them after his death. Hoerni named Greg Mortenson as the first Executive Director of the organization, which continues to build schools in Pakistan and Afghanistan.

In December 2007, an article was published by Michael Riordan on Hoerni and his planar process in IEEE Spectrum. The author claimed that Jay Last pointed out that Hoerni had incredible stamina and could hike for hours on little food or water.

== Awards ==
Year	Organization	Award	Citation	Ref.
1966	Franklin Institute; Philadelphia City Council	John Scott Award	"[For the] method of achieving true dimensional surface passivation of semi-conductor devices as an integral part of the basic manufacturing process."	
1969	Franklin Institute	Edward Longstreth Medal	—	
1972	IEEE Computer Society	W. Wallace McDowell Award	"For significantly influencing the architecture and design of data processing systems by inventing the planar process of semi-conductor circuit fabrication -- the development that made possible the economical mass production of reliable integrated circuits and semi-conductor memories."	

== Patents ==
- 1962, U.S. Patent 3,025,589 A «Method of manufacturing semiconductor devices», assigned to Fairchild Camera and Instrument Corp.
- 1962, U.S. Patent 3,064,167 A «Semiconductor device», assigned to Fairchild Camera and Instrument Corp.
- 1963, U.S. Patent 3,108,914 A «Transistor manufacturing process», assigned to Fairchild Camera and Instrument Corp.
