= Shockley Semiconductor Laboratory =

Early semiconductor company

Coordinates: 37.4049544°N 122.1109664°W

Shockley Transistor Corporation
- Formerly: Shockley Semiconductor Laboratory
- Type: Public
- Industry: Semiconductors
- Founded: 1955; 71 years ago
- Founders: William Shockley
- Defunct: 1968,
- Fate: Acquired by Clevite
- Headquarters: 391 San Antonio Road, Mountain View, California, United States
- Area served: Worldwide
- Products: Four-layer diode
- Number of employees: 9,000
- Parent: Beckman Instruments (1955–1960); Clevite (1960-1968); ITT (1968)

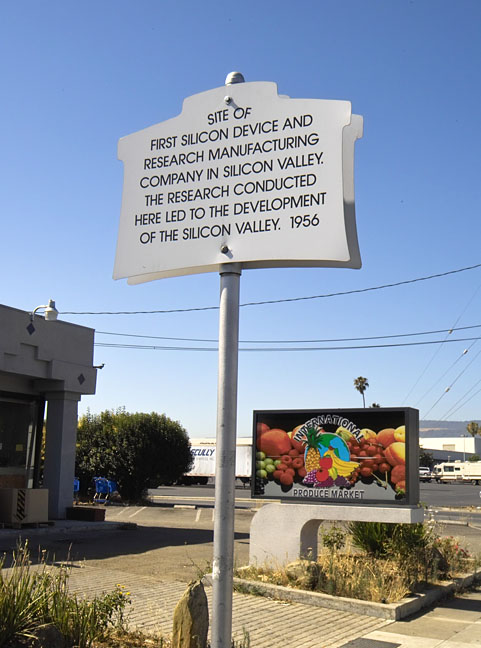
The original Shockley building at 391 San Antonio Road, Mountain View, California, was a produce market in 2006 and has since been demolished.

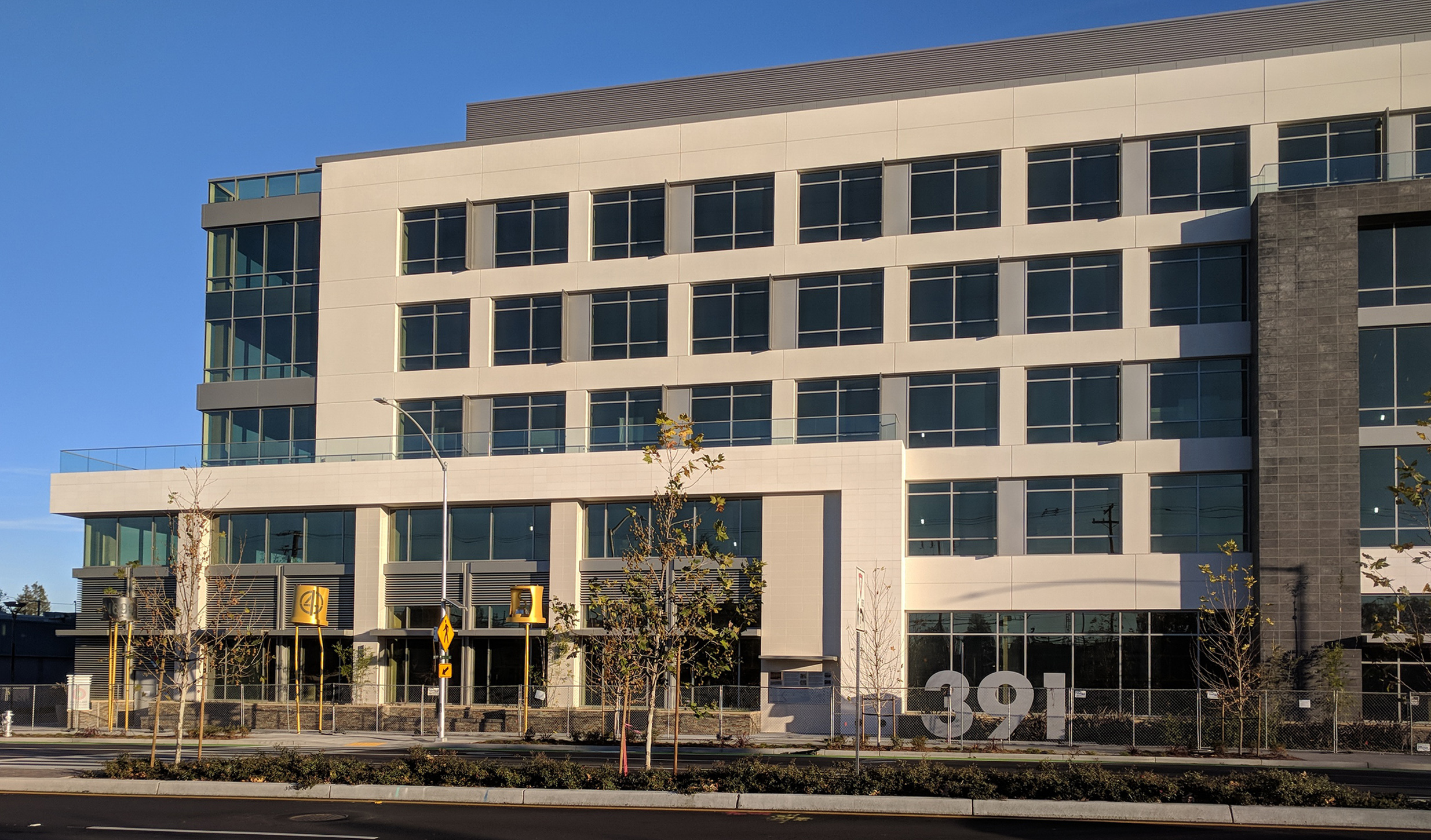
The 391 San Antonio Road, Mountain View, site of the Shockley Semiconductor Laboratory, in Dec. 2017. The new project being completed here includes: * a display of sculptures of packaged semiconductors, including - a 2N696 transistor, - a Shockley 4-layer diode, and - another diode, standing above the sidewalk (seen at the left here).

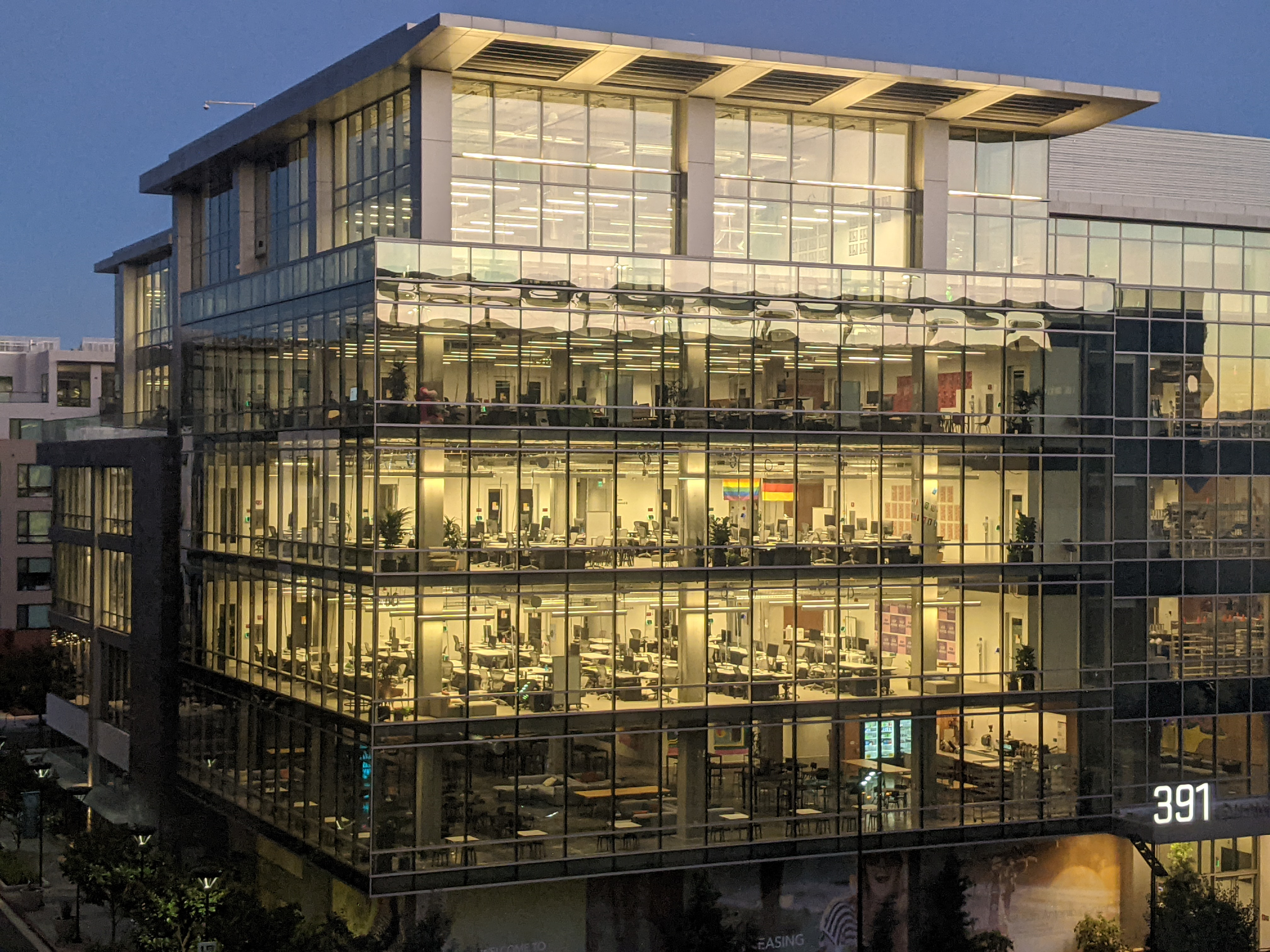
Facebook's building 391, at the site of the Shockley Semiconductor Laboratory in Mountain View, California; pre-dawn view from the Hyatt Centric Hotel

Shockley Semiconductor Laboratory, later known as Shockley Transistor Corporation, was a pioneering semiconductor developer founded by William Shockley, and funded by Beckman Instruments, Inc., in 1955. It was the first high technology company, in what came to be known as Silicon Valley, to work on silicon-based semiconductor devices.

In 1957, the eight leading scientists resigned, and became the core of what would later become Fairchild Semiconductor. Shockley Semiconductor never recovered from this departure; it was purchased by Clevite in 1960, then sold to ITT in 1968, and shortly after, officially closed

== Shockley's return to California ==
William Shockley received his undergraduate degree from Caltech and moved east to complete his PhD at MIT with a focus on physics. He graduated in 1936 and immediately went to work at Bell Labs. Through the 1930s and '40s he worked on electron devices, and increasingly with semiconductor materials, pioneering the field of solid state electronics. This led to the 1947 creation of the first transistor, in partnership with John Bardeen, Walter Brattain and others. Through the early 1950s a series of events led to Shockley becoming increasingly upset with Bell's management, and especially what he saw as a slighting when Bell promoted Bardeen and Brattain's names ahead of his own on the transistor's patent. However, others that worked with him suggested the reason for these issues was Shockley's abrasive management style, and it was this reason that he was constantly passed over for promotion within the company. These issues came to a head in 1953 and he took a sabbatical and returned to Caltech as a visiting professor.

Shockley struck up a friendship with Arnold Orville Beckman, who had invented the pH meter in 1934. Shockley had become convinced that the natural capabilities of silicon meant it would eventually replace germanium as the primary material for transistor construction. Texas Instruments had recently started production of silicon transistors (in 1954), and Shockley thought he could create a superior product. Beckman agreed to back Shockley's efforts in this area, under the umbrella of his company, Beckman Instruments. However, Shockley wanted to live closer to his mother who lived in Palo Alto. Shockley set about recruiting his first four PhD physicists: William W. Happ who had previously worked on semiconductor devices at Raytheon, George Smoot Horsley and Leopoldo B. Valdes from Bell Labs, and Richard Victor Jones, a recent Berkeley graduate.

The Shockley Semiconductor Laboratory opened for business in a small commercial lot in nearby Mountain View in 1956. Initially he tried to hire more of his former workers from Bell Labs, but they were reticent to leave the east coast, then the center of most high-tech research. Instead, he assembled a team of young scientists and engineers, some from other parts of Bell Laboratories, and set about designing a new type of crystal-growth system that could produce single-crystal silicon boules, at that time a difficult prospect given silicon's high melting point.

== Shockley diodes ==
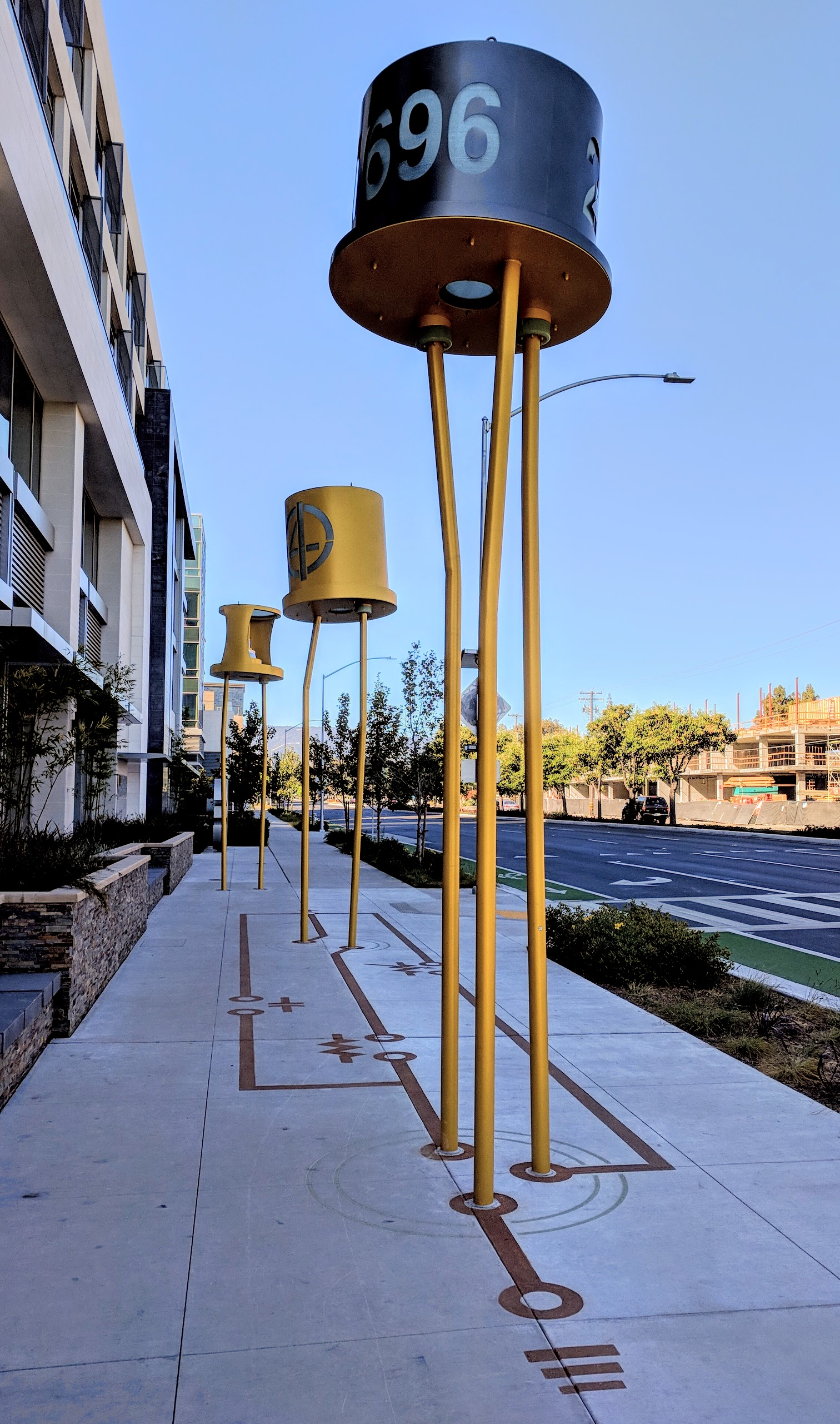
A sidewalk schematic diagram with component sculptures, in front of the original location of the Shockley Semiconductor Laboratory at 391 San Antonio Road, Mountain View, California. The 2N696 transistor and the Shockley four-layer diode behind it are parts of an oscillator circuit.

While work on the transistors continued, Shockley hit upon the idea of using a four-layer device (transistors are three) that would have the novel quality of locking into the "on" or "off" state with no further control inputs. Similar circuits required several transistors, typically three, so for large switching networks the new diodes would greatly reduce complexity. The four-layer diode is now called the Shockley diode.

Building and replicating the four-layer diode proved to be a complicated task and his colleagues argued that the project was too risky for a beginner company to invest their time and resources into. Instead, the other workers wanted to quickly produce a reliable product like a three layer diode before focusing on more difficult tasks such as this.

Shockley became convinced that the new device would be just as important as the transistor, and kept the entire project secret, even within the company. This led to increasingly paranoid behavior; in one famed incident he was convinced that a secretary's cut finger was a plot to injure him and ordered lie detector tests on everyone in the company. This was combined with Shockley's vacillating management of the projects; sometimes he felt that getting the basic transistors into immediate production was paramount, and would de-emphasize the Shockley diode project in order to make the "perfect" production system. This upset many of the employees, and mini-rebellions became commonplace.

== Traitorous eight ==
Eventually a group of the youngest employees – Julius Blank, Victor Grinich, Jean Hoerni, Eugene Kleiner, Jay Last, Gordon Moore, Robert Noyce, and Sheldon Roberts – went over Shockley's head to Arnold Beckman, demanding that Shockley be replaced. Beckman initially appeared to agree with their demands, but over time made a series of decisions that supported Shockley. Fed up, the group broke ranks and sought support from Fairchild Camera and Instrument, an Eastern U.S. company with considerable military contracts. In 1957, Fairchild Semiconductor was started with plans for making silicon transistors. Shockley called the young scientists the "traitorous eight" and said they would never be successful. The eight later left Fairchild and started companies of their own.

Over a period of 20 years, 65 different companies were started by 1st or 2nd generation teams that traced their origins in Silicon Valley to Shockley Semiconductor. In 2014, Tech Crunch revisited Don Hoefler's 1971 article, claiming 92 public companies of 130 descendant listed firms were then worth over US$2.1 Trillion. They also claimed over 2,000 companies could be traced back to Fairchild's eight co-founders.

== Awards and Recognition ==
The Shockley Semiconductor Laboratory has been honored with two IEEE milestones recognizing its efforts in engineering. One plaque marks the lab as the “Birthplace of Silicon Valley (1956), the other celebrates the work done by Gordon E. Moore in the lab which led to what is known as Moore’s Law.

== Shockley Building History ==
391 San Antonio Road, Mountain View is an address that has housed a few notable clients of interest. After Shockley Semiconductor labs, the company's headquarters building was repurposed as a retail store, and by 2015 plans were made to demolish the site to develop a new building complex. By 2017, the site was redeveloped with new signage marking it as the "Real Birthplace of Silicon Valley."

== See also ==
- Thyristor – a concept first proposed by William Shockley
