= Monocyte distribution width =

- Synonyms: MDW
- Purpose: measure of the range of variation of monocyte volume

Monocyte distribution width (MDW) is a cytometry-based parameter that measures the range of variation of monocytes. If the parameter is available, it is reported as part of the standard complete blood count (CBC) with differential.

The parameter was FDA cleared as an early sepsis indicator for ER patients in 2019 for Beckman Coulter.

MDW serves as an indicator for early screening of sepsis in conjunction with CRP and PCT and for differentiating false positive blood cultures.
