= Traitorous eight =

Shockley Semiconductor employees who left to found Fairchild Semiconductor

From left to right: Gordon Moore, C. Sheldon Roberts, Eugene Kleiner, Robert Noyce, Victor Grinich, Julius Blank, Jean Hoerni and Jay Last (1960)

The traitorous eight was a group of eight employees who left Shockley Semiconductor Laboratory in 1957 to found Fairchild Semiconductor. By 1956, William Shockley had recruited a group of young Ph.D. graduates with the goal to develop and produce new semiconductor devices. While Shockley had received a Nobel Prize in Physics and was an experienced researcher and teacher, his management of the group was authoritarian and unpopular. (Note: Berlin, pp. 86–87; Coller, p. 174; Elkus, 2008, p. 91: "Shockley's paranoid, micromanaging personality ... kept his company from producing any viable commercial product"; Lojek, 2007, p. 77; Plotz, 2010, p. 90: "A disastrously bad businessman and a worse manager"; Thackray, 2000, p. 246; Shurkin, pp. 173–174: "In truth, he had no idea how to manage ... One physicist swore that Shockley could actually see electrons [but] He had trouble seeing people." Shockley's managing abilities were even mentioned in his Stanford University obituary: Linvill, J.; et al. (1989). "Memorial Resolution: William Shockley (1910–1989)" (PDF). Stanford University. Archived from the original (PDF) on 2011-10-20. "In retrospect, it is clear that the kind of intellectual leadership Bill Shockley so brilliantly exercised at the Bell Laboratories did not directly translate into business management success") This was accentuated by Shockley's research focus not proving fruitful. (Note: Shurkin, 2008, pp. 231–235; Berlin 2005, p. 87; Coller, 2009, p. 174; Elkus, 2008, p. 91; Manners, 1995, p. 36; Plotz 2005, p. 90; Robinson 2010; Thackray, 2000, p. 245; etc.) After the demand for Shockley to be replaced was rebuffed, the eight left to form their own company.

Shockley described their leaving as a "betrayal." The eight who left Shockley Semiconductor were Julius Blank, Victor Grinich, Jean Hoerni, Eugene Kleiner, Jay Last, Gordon Moore, Robert Noyce, and Sheldon Roberts. In August 1957, they reached an agreement with Sherman Fairchild, and on September 18, 1957, they formed Fairchild Semiconductor. The newly founded Fairchild Semiconductor soon grew into a leader in the semiconductor industry. In 1960, it became an incubator of Silicon Valley and was directly or indirectly involved in the creation of dozens of corporations, including Intel and AMD. These many spin-off companies came to be known as "Fairchildren."

== Initiation ==
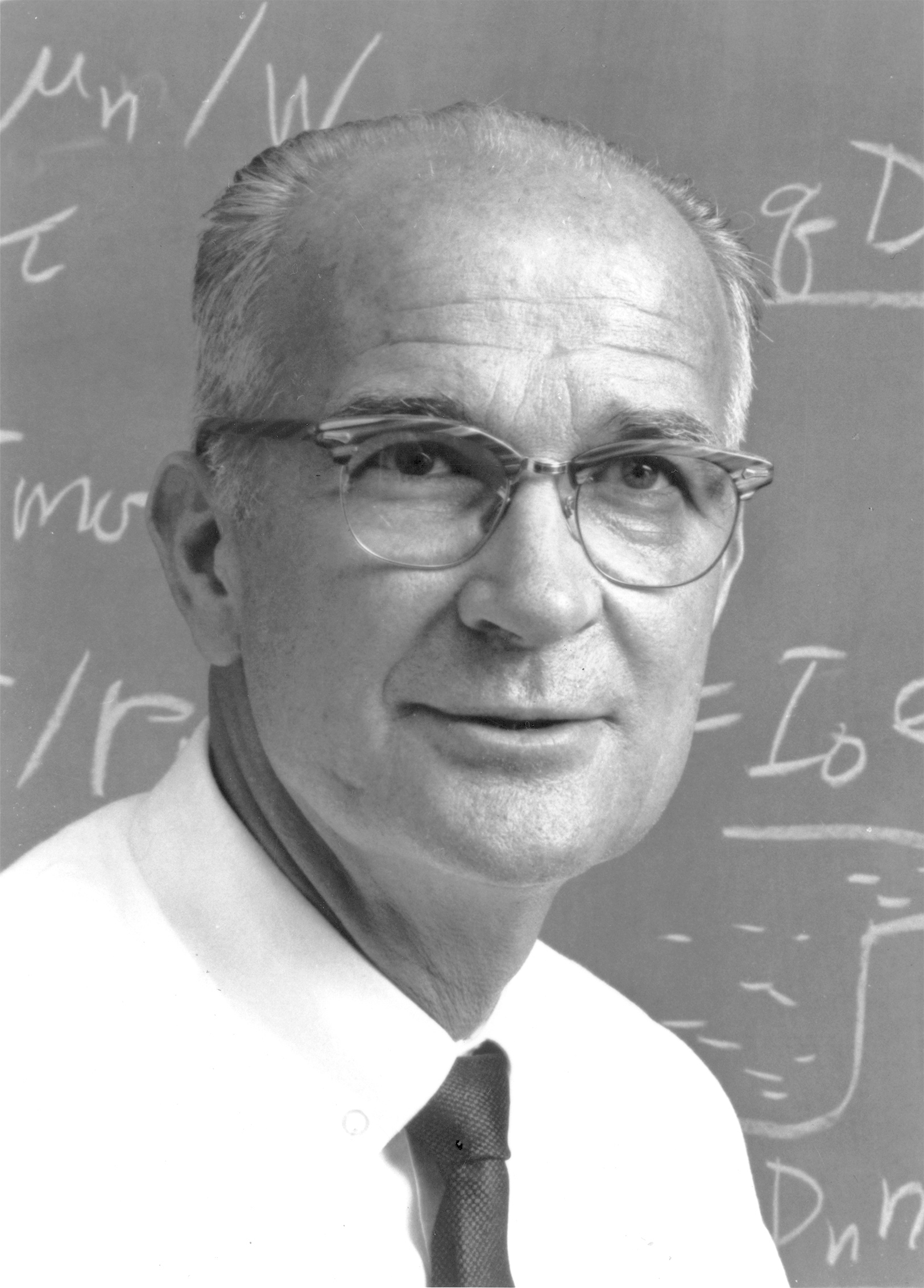
Shockley in 1975

In the winter of 1954–1955, William Shockley, an inventor of the transistor and a visiting professor at Stanford University, decided to establish his own mass production of advanced transistors and Shockley diodes. He found a sponsor in Raytheon, but Raytheon discontinued the project after a month. In August 1955, Shockley turned for advice to the financier Arnold Beckman, the owner of Beckman Instruments. Shockley needed one million dollars (equivalent to $12 million in 2025). Beckman suspected that Shockley's business would not succeed, yet believed that Shockley's new inventions would be beneficial for his own company and did not want to give them to his competitors. Accordingly, Beckman agreed to create and fund a laboratory under the condition that its discoveries should be brought to mass production within two years.

The new department of Beckman Instruments took the name Shockley Semi-Conductor Laboratories (the hyphen was conventional in those years). During 1955, Beckman and Shockley signed the deal, bought licenses on all necessary patents for $25,000, and selected the location in Mountain View, near Palo Alto, California. Though Shockley did recruit four PhD physicists, William W. Happ (from Raytheon Corporation) George Smoot Horsley and Leopoldo B. Valdes (both from Bell Labs), and Richard Victor Jones (a fresh Berkeley graduate), the location provided limited enticement for new employees. The vast majority of semiconductor-related companies and professionals were based on the East Coast, so Shockley posted ads in The New York Times and the New York Herald Tribune. Early respondents included Sheldon Roberts of Dow Chemical, Robert Noyce of Philco, and Jay Last, a former intern of Beckman Instruments. The newspaper campaign brought some three hundred responses, and fifteen people, including Gordon Moore and David Allison, were recruited by Shockley himself at a meeting of the American Physical Society.

Selection continued throughout 1956. Shockley was a proponent of social technologies (which later led him to eugenics) and asked each candidate to pass a psychological test, followed by an interview.

Blank, Last, Moore, Noyce, and Roberts started working in April–May, and Kleiner, Grinich, and Hoerni came during the summer. By September 1956, the lab had 32 employees, including Shockley. Each successful candidate had to negotiate his salary with Shockley. Kleiner, Noyce, and Roberts settled for $1,000 per month; the less-experienced Last got $675. Hoerni did not bother about his payment. Shockley set his own salary at $2,500 and made all salaries accessible to all employees.

Traitorous eight in 1956: education and work experience
Name and birth year	Degree and education	Work experience
Julius Blank; 1925	Mechanical engineer. BA from City College (New York, 1950).	Engineer at Babcock & Wilcox (1950–1952). Designer at Western Electric, Kearny, New Jersey (1952–1956).
Victor Grinich; 1924	Electronics engineer. PhD from Stanford University (1953).	Engineer at SRI International (1953–1956), design of computer and TV circuits.
Jean Hoerni; 1924	Physicist. PhD from the University of Geneva (1950) and Cambridge University (1952).	Researcher in crystallography and solid state physics at the Faculty of Chemistry at Caltech (1952–1956) with publications in Nature and Physical Review
Eugene Kleiner; 1923	Mechanical engineer. MA from the New York University (1950).	Designed naval artillery and industrial machinery. Together with Blank worked at Western Electric, where he was also teaching evening courses.
Jay Last; 1929	Physicist. PhD from MIT (1956)	No practical experience
Gordon Moore; 1929	Physical chemist. PhD from the California Institute of Technology (1954).	Studied gas spectra of ballistic rockets at Johns Hopkins University.
Robert Noyce; 1927	Physicist. PhD from MIT (1953).	Researcher at Philco 1953–1956, working on germanium transistors.
Sheldon Roberts; 1926	Metallurgist. PhD from MIT (1952).	Between 1952 and 1956 worked at the Naval Research Laboratory and Dow Chemical.

The members of the future traitorous eight were aged between 26 (Last) and 33 (Kleiner), and six of them held PhDs. Hoerni was an experienced scientist and gifted manager, and, according to Bo Lojek, matched Shockley in intellect. Only Noyce was involved in semiconductor research, and only Grinich had experience in electronics.

== Research strategy ==
Throughout 1956, most members of the lab were assembling and tuning the equipment, and "pure scientists" Hoerni and Noyce carried out individual applied research. Shockley refused to hire technical staff, believing that his scientists should be able to handle all technological processes. After resettlement, he focused on fine-tuning Shockley diodes for mass production, and five employees, led by Noyce, continued the work on a field effect transistor for Beckman Instruments. Shockley refused to work on bipolar transistors, which later was proven a strategic mistake because the work on Shockley diodes required so much effort that the produced devices were commercial failures.

According to Noyce and Moore, as well as David Brock and Joel Shurkin, the shift from bipolar transistors to Shockley diodes was unexpected. Shockley initially planned to work on the mass production of diffusion bipolar transistors, but then set up a "secret project" on Shockley diodes, and in 1957 stopped all works on bipolar transistors. The reasons for this turn are unknown. According to Beckman's biographer, Shockley regarded his diode as an interesting scientific problem and chose it neglecting Beckman's commercial interests.

Bo Lojek, based on the archives of Shockley, believes that Shockley Labs never worked on bipolar transistors; that Shockley diodes were Shockley and Beckman's original target, for which Beckman Instruments received military R&D contracts; and that Shockley diodes could have found widespread use in telephony if Shockley had improved their reliability.

== Frictions ==
Historians and colleagues generally agree that Shockley was a poor manager and businessman. From early childhood he was prone to outbursts of unprovoked aggression, which were suppressed only due to the internal discipline of his past working environment. He also tended to see rivals, even in his own subordinates.

On November 1, 1956, it was announced that the 1956 Nobel Prize in Physics would be awarded to Shockley, John Bardeen, and Walter Brattain. The related public events of November–December overtired Shockley and took him away from the lab at a time when it had several management problems. Despite the festivities, the atmosphere in the lab was unhealthy.

Although Shockley was never diagnosed by psychiatrists, historians characterized Shockley's state of mind in 1956–1957 as paranoia or autism. All phone calls were recorded, and the staff was not allowed to share their results with each other, which was not feasible since they all worked in a small building. Shockley, not trusting his employees, was sending their reports to Bell Labs for double-checking. At some point, he demanded the entire lab submit to a lie detector test, though everyone refused.

The team started losing its members, starting with Valdes, the most experienced, who quit about a year after he was hired. This was followed by the departure of Jones, a technologist, who left in January 1957 due to a conflict with Grinich and Hoerni. Noyce and Moore then stood on different sides: Moore led the dissidents, whereas Noyce stood behind Shockley and tried to resolve conflicts. Shockley appreciated that and considered Noyce as his sole support in the group.

== Resignation ==
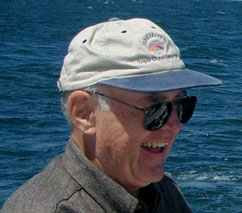
Gordon Moore in 2004

In March 1957, Kleiner, who was beyond Shockley's suspicions, asked permission ostensibly to visit an exhibition in Los Angeles. Instead, he flew to New York to seek investors for a new company, and his parents, New York residents, assisted him. Kleiner was supported by Blank, Grinich, Last, Roberts, Hoerni and Moore. Arthur Rock and Alfred Coyle from Hayden, Stone & Co. became interested in the offer, believing that trainees of a Nobel laureate were destined to succeed.

As a last resort, on May 29, 1957, a group led by Moore presented Arnold Beckman with an ultimatum: solve the "Shockley problem" or they would leave. Moore suggested finding a professor position for Shockley and replacing him in the lab with a professional manager. Beckman refused, believing that Shockley could still improve the situation, later regretting this decision.

In June 1957, Beckman finally put a manager between Shockley and the team, but by then seven key employees had already made their decision. At the last minute they were joined by Noyce. Roberts persuaded him to attend the meeting of the "California group", as they called themselves in the agreement with Fairchild. The meeting was held at the Clift Hotel in San Francisco and was attended by Rock and Coyle. These ten people became the core of a new company.

Coyle, a ruddy-faced Irishman with a fondness for ceremony, pulled out 10 newly minted $1 bills and laid them carefully on the table. "Each of us should sign every bill", he said. These dollar bills, covered with signatures, he explained, would be their contracts with each other.

Finding investors proved to be difficult. The US electronics industry was concentrated in the east, and the California group preferred to stay near Palo Alto. In August 1957, Rock and Coyle met with the inventor and businessman Sherman Fairchild, founder of Fairchild Aircraft and Fairchild Camera. Fairchild sent Rock to his deputy, Richard Hodgson. Hodgson, risking his reputation, accepted the offer and within a few weeks completed all paperwork. The capital of the new company, Fairchild Semiconductor, was divided into 1,325 shares. Each member of the traitorous eight received 100 shares, 225 shares went to Hayden, Stone & Co and 300 shares remained in reserve. Fairchild provided a loan of $1.38 million. To secure the loan, the traitorous eight gave Fairchild the voting rights on their shares, with the right to buy their shares at a fixed total price of $3 million.

On September 18, 1957, Blank, Grinich, Kleiner, Last, Moore, Noyce, Roberts, and Hoerni resigned from Shockley Labs. They became known as the "traitorous eight", though it is not known who coined the term. Shockley could never understand the reasons for this defection. After that time, he never talked to Noyce again, but continued to follow the work of "The Eight." He also combed through all records left by The Eight, basing patents, held as Shockley Labs' intellectual property, on any important ideas. Happ, who had convinced Shockley to hire Noyce and Moore, subsequently left in 1958 for Lockheed Corporation.

In 1960, with the help of a new team, Shockley brought his own diode to serial production, but time had been lost, and competitors had already come close to the development of integrated circuits. Beckman sold the unprofitable Shockley Labs to investors from Cleveland. On July 23, 1961, Shockley was seriously injured in a car crash, and after recovery left the company and returned to teaching at Stanford. In 1969, IT&T, the new owners of Shockley Labs, moved the company to Florida. When the staff refused to move, the lab ceased to exist.

== Split ==
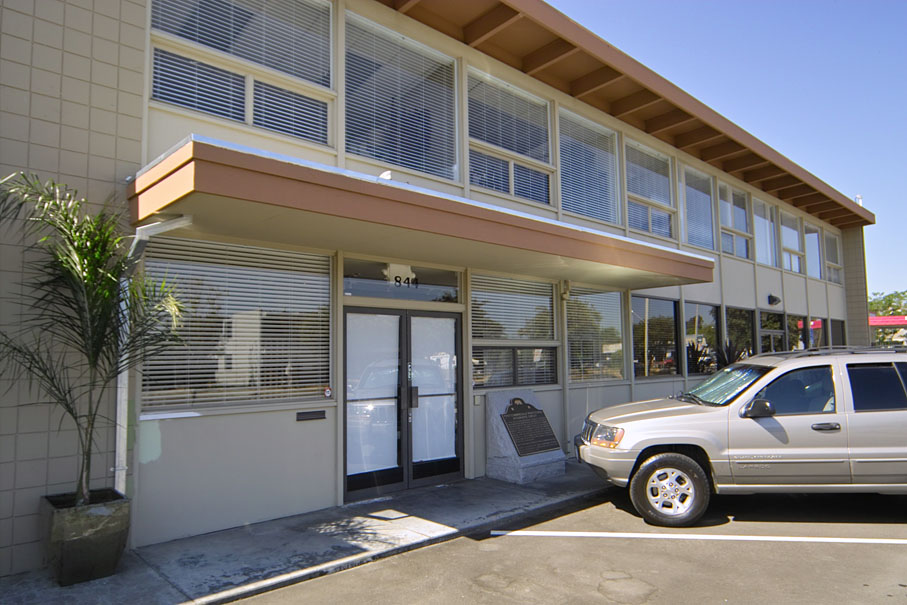
The first building of Fairchild Semiconductor, at 844 East Charleston Road, Palo Alto, California

We were all focused on the single goal of producing our first product, a double diffused silicon mesa transistor ... We were all very young (27 to 32), only a few years beyond our school days. We were a very compatible group and spent a lot of time outside our working hours. Most of the founders were married, busy starting their families and raising small children in addition to all the time and effort they were spending building Fairchild ... I am struck by what a remarkable time it was and what innovative opportunities. – Jay T. Last, 2010

In November 1957, The Eight moved out of Grinich's garage into a new, empty building on the border of Palo Alto and Mountain View. Their starting salaries ranged from $13,800 to $15,600 per year. Hodgson, who headed the board of directors, suggested Noyce as the operational manager of the company, but Noyce refused. Fairchild, knowing Noyce's personality, also opposed his leadership. Regardless of the will of Fairchild, Noyce and Moore, who were responsible for the research and production, respectively, became the "leaders among equals."

The group immediately set a clear goal to produce an array of silicon diffusion mesa transistors for digital devices, utilizing the research results of Bell Labs and Shockley Labs. Moore, Hoerni, and Last led three teams working on three alternative technologies. The technology of Moore resulted in a higher yield of operational n-p-n transistors, and in July–September 1958, they went into mass production. The release of p-n-p transistors of Hoerni was delayed until early 1959. This created the Moore-Hoerni conflict at Fairchild: Moore ignored the contribution of Hoerni, and Hoerni believed that his work was unfairly treated. However, the Moore transistors formed the prestige of Fairchild Semiconductor – for several years, they beat all the competitors.

In 1958, Fairchild mesa transistors were considered for the D-17B Minuteman I guidance computer, but they did not meet military standards of reliability. Fairchild already had a solution in the planar technology which Hoerni proposed on December 1, 1957. In the spring of 1958, Hoerni and Last were spending nights on experiments with the first planar transistors. The planar technology later became the second most important event in the history of microelectronics, after the invention of the transistor, but in 1959 it went unnoticed. Fairchild announced the transition from mesa to planar technology in October 1960. However, Moore refused to credit this achievement to Hoerni, and in 1996 even attributing it to unnamed Fairchild engineers.

In 1959, Sherman Fairchild exercised his right to purchase shares of the members of the traitorous eight. Jay Last recalled (in 2007) that this event happened too early and turned former partners into ordinary employees, destroying the team spirit. In November 1960, Tom Bay, the Vice President of Marketing at Fairchild, accused Last of squandering money and demanded termination of Last's project of developing integrated circuits. Moore refused to help Last, and Noyce declined to discuss the matter. This conflict was the last straw: on January 31, 1961, Last and Hoerni left Fairchild and to head Amelco, the microelectronics branch of Teledyne. Kleiner and Roberts joined them after a few weeks. Blank, Grinich, Moore, and Noyce stayed with Fairchild. The traitorous eight split into two groups of four.

== Heritage ==
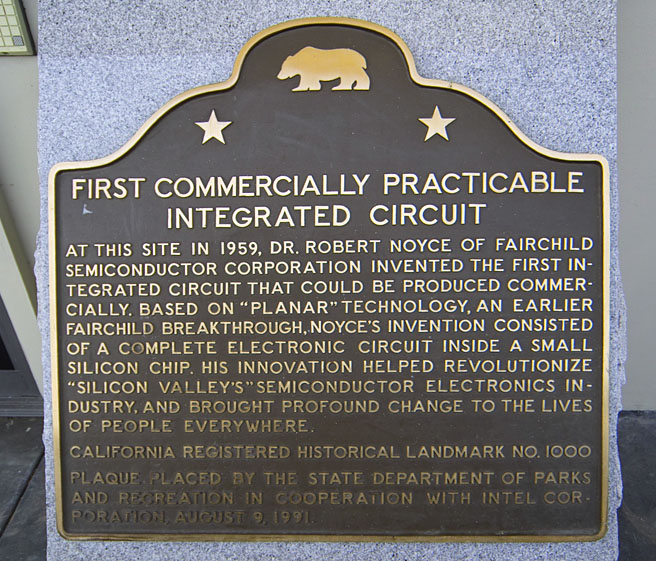
The historic marker at the Fairchild building at which the "traitorous eight" set up shop and the first commercially practical integrated circuit was invented

From 1960–1965, Fairchild was the undisputed leader of the semiconductor market, both technologically and in terms of sales. Early 1965 brought the first signs of management problems. In November 1965, the creators of integrated operational amplifiers Bob Widlar and David Talbert left for National Semiconductor. In February 1967, they were followed by five top managers who disagreed with Noyce. Noyce started litigation with shareholders and effectively removed himself from the operational management. In July 1967, the company became unprofitable and lost their leading position in the market to Texas Instruments.

In March 1968, Moore and Noyce decided to leave Fairchild and again, as nine years prior, turned to Arthur Rock. In the summer of 1968, they founded NM Electronics. Blank, Grinich, Kleiner, Last, Hoerni, and Roberts set aside the past disagreements and financially supported the company of Moore and Noyce. A year later, NM Electronics bought the trade name rights from the hotel chain Intelco and took the name of Intel. Moore held senior positions at Intel until 1997 when he was named Chairman Emeritus of Intel Corporation. Noyce left Intel in 1987 to lead the non-profit consortium Sematech. He died suddenly in 1990, the first of The Eight.

Grinich left Fairchild in 1968 for a short sabbatical and then taught at UC Berkeley and Stanford, where he published the first comprehensive textbook on integrated circuits. He later co-founded and ran several companies developing industrial radio-frequency identification (RFID) tags.

Blank was the last of The Eight to leave Fairchild in 1969. He founded the financial firm Xicor specializing in innovative start-ups, and in 2004 sold it for $529 million.

Hoerni headed Amelco until the summer of 1963 and, after the conflict with the Teledyne owners, for three years headed Union Carbide Electronics. In July 1967, supported by the watch company Société Suisse pour l'Industrie Horlogère (the predecessor of Swatch Group) founded Intersil, the company that created the market for custom CMOS circuits. The circuits developed by Intersil for Seiko in 1969–1970 contributed to the rise of Japanese electronic watches. Intersil and Intel weren't competitors as Intel released a limited set of templated circuits for computers and sold them initially only in the U.S. market, whereas Intersil focused on custom CMOS circuits with low power consumption and sold them worldwide.

Last remained with Amelco and for twelve years served as Vice President of Technology at Teledyne. In 1982, he founded Hillcrest Press specializing in art books.

After leaving Amelco, Roberts led his own business, and in 1973–1987 served as a trustee of the Rensselaer Polytechnic Institute. Amelco, after numerous mergers, acquisitions, and renaming, became a subsidiary of Microchip Technology.

In 1972, Kleiner and Tom Perkins from Hewlett-Packard founded the venture capital fund Kleiner Perkins Caufield & Byers, which has been involved in the creation and/or funding of Amazon.com, Compaq, Genentech, Intuit, Lotus, Macromedia, Netscape, Sun Microsystems, Symantec and dozens of other companies. Kleiner later wrote that his goal was to geographically spread the venture financing.

== Honors ==
In May 2011, the California Historical Society gave the "Legends of California Award" to The Eight. Blank, Last, Moore, and Roberts' son Dave attended the event in San Francisco.

== Fairchildren ==
In research, reporting, and popular lore related to Silicon Valley, the term "Fairchildren" has been used to refer to:

- The corporate spin-offs created by former employees of Fairchild Semiconductor. This usage was propagated by historian Leslie Berlin through her 2001 review article, PhD thesis, and biography of Robert Noyce.
- The founders of such firms. This is the earliest usage, e.g., in the 1978 BBC Horizon documentary "Now the Chips are Down", Tom Wolfe's 1983 profile of Noyce or a 5,000-word profile of Silicon Valley in 1999.
- Former Fairchild Semiconductor employees, as in a 1988 New York Times article.
- The original founders of Fairchild Semiconductor, more commonly known as the traitorous eight. This has been used by the PBS website and a book by Blasi et al.

One of the first articles to identify Fairchild as the parent of so many spin-offs appeared in Innovation Magazine in 1969. The spin-off companies, such as AMD, Intel, Intersil and restructured National Semiconductor, were different from those of the east coast and California's electronic companies established in the 1940s and 1950s. "Old Californians" like Beckman and Varian Associates did not trust Wall Street and kept control of their companies for decades, whereas the new companies of the 1960s were created for a quick (within 3–5 years) public sale of shares. Their founders built a business strategy based on the expectations of the investment banks. Another characteristic of Silicon Valley was the mobility of managers and professionals among companies. Partly because of Noyce, Silicon Valley developed a culture of openly denying the hierarchical culture of traditional corporations. People remained faithful to each other, but not to the employer or the industry. Fairchild "alumni" can be found not only in electronics-related but also financial and public relations companies.

== See also ==
- Nifty Fifty – Group of 50 companies on the New York Stock Exchange in the 1960s–1970s
- PayPal Mafia, former PayPal employees who founded a number of technology companies

== Bibliography ==
- Berlin, L (2005). The Man Behind the Microchip: Robert Noyce and the Invention of Silicon Valley. New York: Oxford University Press. pp. 85–89. ISBN 9780199839773.
- Castilla, E (2000). "Social Networks in Silicon Valley". In Chong-Moon Lee (ed.). The Silicon Valley edge: a habitat for innovation and entrepreneurship. Stanford Business Books. Stanford University Press. ISBN 9780804740630.
- Coller, J; Chamberlain, C (2009). The lives, loves and deaths of splendidly unreasonable inventors. Infinite Ideas Series. Oxford, UK: Infinite Ideas. pp. 173–177. ISBN 9781906821258.
- Elkus, R. J. (2008). Winner take all: how competitiveness shapes the fate of nations. New York: Basic Books. pp. 91–92. ISBN 9780465003150.
- Holbrook, D (2003). "The Nature, Sources and Consequences of Firm Differences in the Early History of Semiconductor Industry". The SMS Blackwell Handbook of Organizational Capabilities: Emergence, Development, and Change. Strategic Management Society Book Series. John Wiley & Sons. pp. 43–75. ISBN 9781405103046.
- Lécuyer, Christophe (2000). "Fairchild Semiconductor and Its Influence". In Chong-Moon Lee (ed.). The Silicon Valley edge: a habitat for innovation and entrepreneurship. Stanford Business Books. Stanford University Press. pp. 158–183. ISBN 9780804740630.
- Lécuyer, C (2006). Making Silicon Valley: innovation and the growth of high tech, 1930–1970. MIT Press. ISBN 9780262122818.
- Lécuyer, Christophe; Brock, David C. (2010). Makers of the Microchip: A Documentary History of Fairchild Semiconductor. Foreword by Jay Last. MIT Press. ISBN 9780262014243.
- Lojek, B (2007). History of semiconductor engineering. Springer. pp. 178–187. ISBN 9783540342571.
- Manners, D; Makimoto, T (1995). Living with the chip. Springer. ISBN 9780412616907.
- Plotz, D (2005). The genius factory: the curious history of the Nobel Prize sperm bank. Oxford, UK: Random House. p. 90. ISBN 9781400061242.
- Robinson, A (2010). Sudden Genius?. Oxford, UK: Oxford University Press. ISBN 9780191624926.
- Shurkin, J (2008). Broken Genius: The Rise and Fall of William Shockley, Creator of the Electronic Age. International series on advances in solid state electronics and technology. Palgrave Macmillan. ISBN 9780230551923.
- Thackray, A; Myers, M (2000). Arnold O. Beckman: one hundred years of excellence. Chemical Heritage Foundation series in innovation and entrepreneurship. Vol. 3. Chemical Heritage Foundation. pp. 238–250. ISBN 9780941901239.
- Thackray, Arnold; Brock, David C.; Jones, Rachel (2015). Moore's Law: The Life of Gordon Moore, Silicon Valley's Quiet Revolutionary. Basic Books. ISBN 9780465055647.
