= Peter Lennie =

American neuroscientist

Peter Lennie is a British-born neuroscientist and academic administrator. He is the Jay Last Distinguished University Professor at the University of Rochester, in Rochester, New York, and the executive director of the Worldwide Universities Network.

== Education ==
As an undergraduate Lennie attended the University of Hull, England, and graduated in 1969 with first class honors in psychology. He was a graduate student at the University of Cambridge, from which he obtained his PhD in experimental psychology in 1972. From 1972 to 1974 he held a Harkness Fellowship at Northwestern University, and from 1974 to 1976 held a Research Fellowship at King's College, Cambridge.

== Career ==
Lennie's PhD, on the visual perception of orientation, led him as a postdoctoral fellow to pursue the brain mechanisms underlying perception, first working with Christina Enroth Cugell at Northwestern University, and then with Horace Barlow at Cambridge. His subsequent career as a neuroscientist dealt principally with the function of the early stages of vision, from the retina to primary visual cortex. It focused particularly on how the successive stages of analysis encode and represent information about the form and color of objects

Lennie was lecturer in experimental psychology at the University of Sussex from 1976 to 1982, when he moved to the University of Rochester as associate professor, then professor of psychology. In 1995 he became founding chair of the Department of Brain and Cognitive Sciences. In 1998 he moved to New York University as dean for science and professor of neural science, before returning to Rochester in 2006 as senior vice president and Robert L. and Mary L. Sproull Dean of the Faculty of Arts, Sciences and Engineering. From 2012 to 2016 he served as the university's provost.

His honors and awards include: Harkness Fellowship of the Commonwealth Fund; Kings College Research Fellow; Fellow of the Optical Society of America; NIH MERIT award; Perception Lecturer.

== Selected publications ==
- Derrington, A. M., Krauskopf, J. and Lennie, P. (1984). Chromatic mechanisms in lateral geniculate nucleus of macaque. J. Physiol. (Lond.), 357, 241–265.
- Lennie, P., Krauskopf, J. and Sclar, G. (1990). Chromatic mechanisms in striate cortex of macaque. J. Neurosci., 10, 649–669.
- Lennie, P. (1998). Single units and visual cortical organization. Perception, 27, 889–935.
- Lennie, P., & Van Hemel, S.B. (2002), Eds. Visual Impairments: Determining Eligibility for Social Security Benefits. (pp. 254). Washington DC: National Academy Press.
- Lennie P. (2003) The cost of cortical computation. Current Biology 13, 493–497.
- Tailby C., Solomon S.G., Dhruv N.T., Lennie P. (2008) Habituation reveals fundamental chromatic mechanisms in striate cortex of macaque. Journal of Neuroscience, 28, 1131–1139.

== Neuroscience ==
Lennie provided fundamental insights into the neural machinery of vision, especially how the eye communicates with the brain. His research "sits at the interface between visual perception and visual physiology". He concentrated particularly on how the successive stages of the visual pathway from the eye and the brain's cortex encode and represent information about the form and color of objects.
