= Fred Hoar =

Frederick M. Hoar (1926 – 2 January 2004) was a high-profile Silicon Valley PR and marketing professional. Companies that Hoar worked for included Fairchild Semiconductor and Apple Inc. In his later life, he was a professor at Santa Clara University.
