= Gordon and Betty Moore Foundation =

American charitable foundation

- Moore Foundation logo
- Founded: 2000; 26 years ago
- Founder: Gordon E. Moore and Betty I. Moore
- Purpose: Environmental conservation Science; San Francisco Bay Area
- Location: Palo Alto, California, United States
- Method: Grants
- Key people: Aileen S Lee, President
- Budget: $575 million (annual, 2025)
- Endowment: $11.4 billion (2025)
- Website: www.moore.org

The Gordon and Betty Moore Foundation is an American foundation established by Intel co-founder Gordon E. Moore and his wife Betty I. Moore in September 2000 to support scientific discovery, environmental conservation, and preservation of the character of the San Francisco Bay Area.

As outlined in the Statement of Founder's Intent, the foundation's aim is to tackle large, important issues at a scale where it can achieve significant and measurable impacts.

According to the OECD, the Gordon and Betty Moore Foundation provided US$60 million for development in 2020 by means of grants.

== Active work ==
=== Environmental conservation ===
Programs in the area of environmental conservation include:

- Andes Amazon Initiative
- Arctic Ocean Initiative
- Conservation and Markets Initiative
- Wildfire Resilience Initiative

=== Science ===
Programs in the area of science include:

- Curiosity-Driven Science Initiative
- Emergent Phenomena in Quantum Systems Initiative
- Experimental Physics Investigators Initiative
- Green Chemistry Initiative
- Moore Inventor Fellows
- Symbiosis in Aquatic Systems Initiative

=== San Francisco Bay area ===
Programs in the San Francisco Bay area include:

- Conservation
- Informal Science

== Previously funded work ==
Previously funded work has included:

=== Environmental Conservation ===
- Conservation International
- Marine Conservation Initiative
- Wild Salmon Ecosystem Initiative

=== Patient Care ===
- Betty Irene Moore Nursing Initiative
- Betty Irene Moore School of Nursing
- Diagnostic Excellence

=== Science ===
- California Institute of Technology
- Data-Driven Discovery Initiative
- Marine Microbiology Initiative

== Controversies ==
The Gordon and Betty Moore Foundation has contributed US$200 million towards construction of the Thirty Meter Telescope. A proposed extremely large telescope (ELT), the Thirty Meter Telescope (TMT) is considered controversial due to its planned location on Mauna Kea, which is considered sacred land according to the native Hawaiians, on the island of Hawaii in the United States. Native Hawaiian cultural practice and religious rights are the main points of opposition towards the construction of the Thirty Meter Telescope, along with concerns over the lack of meaningful dialogue during the permitting process.

On October 7, 2014, protesters demonstrated outside the headquarters of the foundation in Palo Alto, California. On July 14, 2019, protesters had created an online petition titled "The Immediate Halt to the Construction of the TMT Telescope" that was posted on Change.org and directed towards the Gordon and Betty Moore Foundation as well as other financial backers. The online petition gathered over 278,057 signatures worldwide.

== See also ==
- List of wealthiest charitable foundations
