= Fairchild Semiconductor =

American integrated circuit manufacturer

Fairchild Semiconductor International, Inc.
- Type: Public
- Traded as: Nasdaq: FCS
- Industry: Semiconductors; Computer Networks; Lighting; Circuit protection
- Founded: October 1, 1957; 68 years ago
- Founders: Sherman Fairchild; Robert Noyce
- Defunct: September 2016
- Fate: Acquired by ON Semiconductor
- Headquarters: Sunnyvale, California, United States
- Area served: Worldwide
- Key people: Mark Thompson (Chairman & CEO); Mark S. Frey (Executive Vice President, CFO & Treasurer)
- Products: Integrated circuits; Signal processors; Motor controllers; Field-effect transistors
- Revenue: ▼US$1.370 billion (2015)
- Operating income: ▼US$6.30 million (2015)
- Net income: ▲ –US$15.1 million (2015)
- Total assets: ▼US$1.58 billion (2015)
- Total equity: ▼US$1.10 billion (2015)
- Number of employees: 6,379 (2015)
- Parent: ON Semiconductor

Site of invention of the first commercially practicable integrated circuit

California Historical Landmark
- Designated: May 8, 1991
- Reference no.: 1000

Fairchild Semiconductor International, Inc. was an American semiconductor company based in San Jose, California. It was founded in 1957 as a division of Fairchild Camera and Instrument by the "traitorous eight" who defected from Shockley Semiconductor Laboratory. It became a pioneer in the manufacturing of transistors and of integrated circuits. Schlumberger bought the firm in 1979 and sold it to National Semiconductor in 1987; Fairchild was spun off as an independent company again in 1997. In September 2016, Fairchild was acquired by ON Semiconductor.

The company had locations in the United States in San Jose, California; San Rafael, California; South Portland, Maine; West Jordan, Utah; Puyallup, Washington; and Mountaintop, Pennsylvania. Outside the US, it operated locations in Australia; Singapore; Bucheon, South Korea; Penang, Malaysia; Suzhou, China; and Cebu City, Philippines, among others.

== History ==
=== 1950s ===
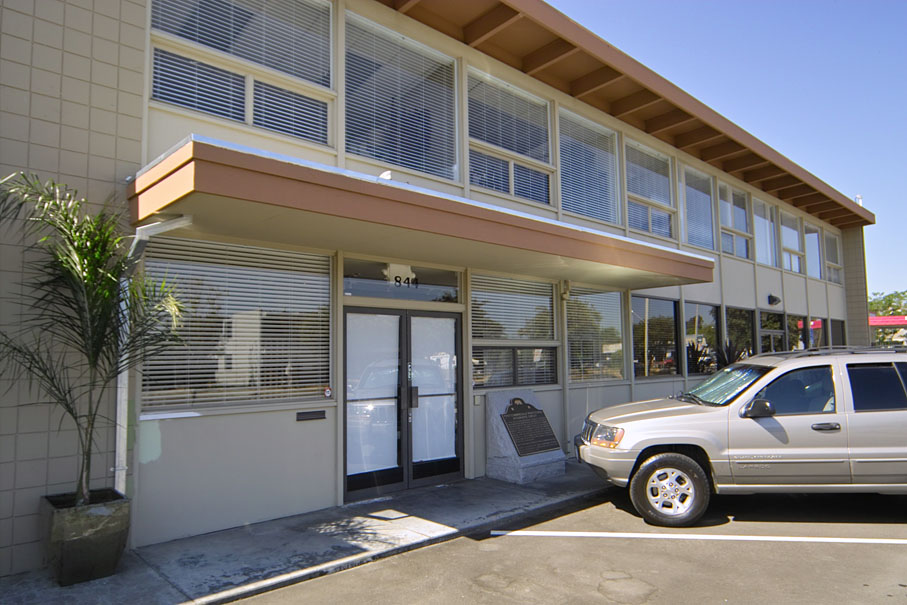
The building at 844 East Charleston Road, Palo Alto, California, where the first commercially practical integrated circuit was invented

In 1955, William Shockley founded Shockley Semiconductor Laboratory, funded by Beckman Instruments in Mountain View, California; his plan was to develop a new type of "4-layer diode" that would work faster and have more uses than then-current transistors. At first he attempted to hire some of his former colleagues from Bell Labs, but none were willing to move to the West Coast or work with Shockley again at that time. Shockley then founded the core of the new company with what he considered the best and brightest graduates coming out of American engineering schools.

While Shockley was effective as a recruiter, he was less effective as a manager. A core group of Shockley employees, later known as the traitorous eight, became unhappy with his management of the company. The eight men were Julius Blank, Victor Grinich, Jean Hoerni, Eugene Kleiner, Jay Last, Gordon Moore, Robert Noyce, and Sheldon Roberts. Looking for funding on their own project, they turned to Sherman Fairchild's Fairchild Camera and Instrument, an Eastern U.S. company with considerable military contracts. In 1957, the Fairchild Semiconductor division was started with plans to make silicon transistors at a time when germanium was still the most common material for semiconductor use.

According to Sherman Fairchild, Noyce's impassioned presentation of his vision was the reason Sherman Fairchild had agreed to create the semiconductor division for the traitorous eight. Noyce advocated the use of silicon as substrate – since the material costs would consist of sand and a few fine wires, the major cost would be in the manufacturing process. Noyce also expressed his belief that silicon semiconductors would herald the start of disposable appliances that, due to cheap electronic components, would not be repaired but merely discarded when worn out.

Their first transistors were of the silicon mesa variety, innovative for their time, but exhibiting relatively poor reliability.

Fairchild's first marketed transistor was the 1958 2N697, a mesa transistor developed by Moore, and it was a success. The first batch of 100 was sold to IBM for $150 apiece in order to build the computer for the B-70 bomber. More were sold to Autonetics to build the guidance system for the Minuteman ballistic missile.

At the same time Jean Hoerni developed the planar process which was a major improvement – transistors could be made more easily, at a lower cost and with greater performance and reliability.

The planar process made most other transistor processes obsolete. One such casualty was Philco's transistor division, whose newly built $40 million plant to make their germanium PADT process transistors became nonviable. Within a few years, every other transistor company paralleled or licensed the Fairchild planar process. Hoerni's 2N1613 was a major success, with Fairchild licensing the design across the industry.

In 1960, Fairchild built a circuit with four transistors on a single wafer of silicon, thereby creating the first silicon integrated circuit (Texas Instruments' Jack Kilby had developed an integrated circuit made of germanium on September 12, 1958, and was awarded a U.S. patent, however Kilby's method was not scalable and the semiconductor industry adopted Fairchild's process to manufacture integrated circuits). The company grew from twelve to twelve thousand employees, and soon had sales of $130 million a year.

=== 1960s ===
Fairchild's Noyce and Texas Instrument's Kilby had independently invented the integrated circuit (IC) based on bipolar technology. In 1960, Noyce invented the planar integrated circuit. The industry preferred Fairchild's invention over Texas Instruments' because the transistors in planar ICs were interconnected by a thin film deposit, whereas Texas Instruments' invention required fine wires to connect the individual circuits. Noyce's invention was enabled by the planar process developed by Jean Hoerni. In turn, Hoerni's planar process was inspired by the surface passivation method developed by Mohamed Atalla at Bell Labs in 1957.

In the early 1960s, Fairchild R&D began experimenting with the MOSFET (metal–oxide–semiconductor field-effect transistor), also known as the MOS transistor. The first MOSFET was invented by Mohamed Atalla and Dawon Kahng at Bell Labs in 1959, and demonstrated in early 1960, but was initially overlooked and ignored by Bell Labs. However, the MOSFET generated significant interest at Fairchild. Inspired by the first MOSFET, Chih-Tang Sah built an MOS-controlled tetrode at Fairchild later that year. MOS devices were later commercialized by Fairchild in 1964, with p-channel devices for logic and switching applications. The experiments led to Fairchild's development of MOS integrated circuits.

In 1963, Fairchild hired Robert Widlar to design analog operational amplifiers using Fairchild's process. Since Fairchild's processes were optimized for digital circuits, Widlar collaborated with process engineer Dave Talbert. The collaboration resulted in two revolutionary products – μA702 and μA709. Hence, Fairchild dominated the analog integrated circuit market, having introduced the first IC operational amplifiers, or "op-amps", Bob Widlar's μA702 (in 1964) and μA709. In 1968, Fairchild introduced David Fullagar's μA741, which became the most popular IC op amp of all time.

By 1965, Fairchild's process improvements had brought low-cost manufacturing to the semiconductor industry – making Fairchild nearly the only profitable semiconductor manufacturer in the United States. Fairchild dominated the market in DTL, op-amps and mainframe computer custom circuits. In 1965, Fairchild opened a semiconductor assembly plant on the Navajo Nation in Shiprock, New Mexico. At its peak, the plant employed over a thousand Navajos, the majority of whom were women. In The Shiprock Dedication Commemorative Brochure released by the Fairchild company, the Diné (Navajo) women circuit makers were celebrated as "culture workers who produced circuits as part of the 'reproductive' labor of expressing Navajo culture, rather than merely for wages." This claim was based on the opinion that circuits of the electronic chips had a mere resemblance with the complex geometric patterns on the Navajo rugs. Paul Driscoll, the Shiprock plant manager, spoke of the "untapped wealth of natural characteristics of the Navajo...the inherent flexibility and dexterity of the Indians." Although highly successful during its operation, the plant was closed in 1975. While the Fairchild corporation claims the Diné women were chosen to work in the Shiprock plant due to their "'nimble fingers'" as previously noted, the women of the Shiprock reservation were actually chosen as the workforce due to a lack of labor rights asserted by the women in addition to "cheap, plentiful workers and tax benefits".

Fairchild had not done well in the digital integrated circuit market. Their first line of ICs was the "micrologic" resistor–transistor logic (RTL) line which was used in the Apollo Guidance Computer. It had the advantage of being extremely simple – each inverter consisted of just one transistor and two resistors. The logic family had many drawbacks that had made it marginal for commercial purposes, and not well suited for military applications: the logic could only tolerate about 100 millivolts of noise – far too low for comfort. It was awhile before Fairchild relied on more robust designs, such as diode–transistor logic (DTL) which had much better noise margins.

Sales due to Fairchild semiconductor division had doubled each year and by the mid-1960s comprised two-thirds of total sales of the parent company. In 1966, Fairchild's sales were second to those of Texas Instruments, followed in third place by Motorola. Noyce was rewarded with the position of corporate vice-president and hence became the de facto head of the semiconductor division.

However, internal trouble at Fairchild began to surface with a drop in earnings in 1967. There was increasing competition from newer start-ups. The semiconductor division, situated in Mountain View and Palo Alto, California, was actually managed by executives from Syosset, New York, who visited the California sites once a year, even though the semiconductor division earned most of the profits of the company. Fairchild's president at that time, John Carter, had used all the profits to fund acquisitions of unprofitable ventures.

Noyce's position on Fairchild's executive staff was consistently compromised by Sherman Fairchild's faction. Charles E. Sporck was Noyce's operations manager. Sporck was reputed to run the tightest operation in the world. Sporck, Pierre Lamond and most managers had grown upset and disillusioned with corporate focus on unprofitable ventures at the expense of the semiconductor division. Executives at the semiconductor division were allotted substantially fewer stock options compared to other divisions. In March 1967, Sporck was hired away by Peter J. Sprague to National Semiconductor. Sporck brought with him four other Fairchild personnel. Actually, Lamond had previously assembled a team of Fairchild managers in preparation to defect to Plessey, a British company. Lamond had recruited Sporck to be his own boss. When negotiations with Plessey broke down over stock options, Lamond and Sporck succumbed to Widlar's and Talbert's (who were already employed at National Semiconductor) suggestion that they look to National Semiconductor. Widlar and Talbert had earlier left Fairchild to join Molectro, which was later acquired by National Semiconductor.

In the fall of 1967, Fairchild suffered a loss for the first time since 1958 and announced write-offs of $4 million due to excess capacity, which contributed to a total loss of $7.6 million. Profits had sunk to $0.50 a share, compared to $3 a share the previous year, while the value of the stock dropped in half. In October 1967, the board ordered Carter to sell off all of Fairchild's unprofitable ventures. Carter responded to the order by resigning abruptly.

Furthermore, Fairchild's DTL technology was being overtaken by Texas Instruments's faster TTL (transistor–transistor logic).

While Noyce was considered the natural successor to Carter, the board decided not to promote him. Sherman Fairchild led the board to choose Richard Hodgson. Within a few months Hodgson was replaced by a management committee led by Noyce, while Sherman Fairchild looked for a new CEO other than Noyce. In response, Noyce discreetly planned a new company with Gordon Moore, the head of R&D. They left Fairchild to found Intel in 1968 and were soon joined by Andrew Grove and Leslie L. Vadász, who took with them the revolutionary MOS Silicon Gate Technology (SGT), recently created in the Fairchild R&D Laboratory by Federico Faggin who also designed the Fairchild 3708, the world’s first commercial MOS integrated circuit using SGT. Fairchild MOS Division was slow in understanding the potential of the SGT which promised not only faster, more reliable, and denser circuits, but also new device types that could enlarge the field of solid state electronics – for example, CCDs for image sensors, dynamic RAMs, and non-volatile memory devices such as EPROM and flash memories. Intel took advantage of the SGT for its memory development. Federico Faggin, frustrated, left Fairchild to join Intel in 1970 and design the first microprocessors using SGT. Among the investors of Intel were Hodgson and five of the founding members of Fairchild.

Sherman Fairchild hired Lester Hogan, who was the head of Motorola semiconductor division. Hogan proceeded to hire another hundred managers from Motorola to entirely displace the management of Fairchild.

The loss of these iconic executives, coupled with Hogan's displacement of Fairchild managers demoralized Fairchild and prompted the entire exodus of employees to found new companies.

Many of the original founders, otherwise known as the "fairchildren", had left Fairchild in the 1960s to form companies that grew to prominence in the 1970s. Robert Noyce and Gordon Moore were among the last of the original founders to leave, at which point the brain-drain of talents that had fueled the growth of the company was complete.

A Fairchild advertisement of the time showed a collage of the logos of Silicon Valley with the annotation "We started it all". It was later, in 1971, Don Hoefler popularized the name "Silicon Valley USA" in Electronic News. He notes he did not invent the name. See also Gregory Gromov and TechCrunch 2014 update of Hoefler's article.

=== 1970s ===
Hogan's action to hire from Motorola had Motorola file a lawsuit against Fairchild, which the court then decided in Fairchild's favor in 1973. Judge William Copple ruled that Fairchild's results were so unimpressive that it was impossible to assess damages "under any theory". Hogan was dismissed as president the next year, but remained as vice chairman.

In 1973, Fairchild became the first company to produce a commercial charge-coupled device (CCD) following its invention at Bell Labs. Digital image sensors are still produced today at their descendant company, Fairchild Imaging. The CCD had a difficult birth, with the devastating effects on Fairchild of the 1973–75 recession that followed on the 1973 oil crisis.

After Intel introduced the 8008 8-bit microprocessor, Fairchild developed the Fairchild F8 8-bit microprocessor, which was according to the CPU Museum "in 1977 the F8 was the world's leading microprocessor in terms of CPU sales."

In 1976, the company released the first video game system to use ROM cartridges, the Fairchild Video Entertainment System (or VES) later renamed Channel F, using the F8 microprocessor. The system was successful initially, but quickly lost popularity when the Atari 2600 Video Computer System (or VCS) was released.

By the end of the 1970s they had few new products in the pipeline, and increasingly turned to niche markets with their existing product line, notably "hardened" integrated circuits for military and space applications and isoplanar ECL products used in exotic applications like Cray Computers. Fairchild was being operated at a loss, and the bottomline subsisted mostly from licensing of its patents.

In 1979, Fairchild Camera and Instrument was purchased by Schlumberger Limited, an oil field services company, for $425 million. At this time, Fairchild's intellectual properties, on which Fairchild had been subsisting, were expiring.

=== 1980s ===
In 1980, under Schlumberger management, the Fairchild Laboratory for Artificial Intelligence Research (FLAIR) was started within Fairchild Research. In 1985 the lab was separated to form Schlumberger Palo Alto Research (SPAR).

Fairchild research developed the Clipper architecture, a 32-bit RISC-like computer architecture, in the 1980s, resulting in the shipping of the C100 chip in 1986. The technology was later sold to Intergraph, its main customer.

Schlumberger sold Fairchild to National Semiconductor in 1987 for $200 million. The sale did not include Fairchild's Test Division, which designed and produced automated test equipment (ATE) for the semiconductor manufacturing industry, nor did it include Schlumberger Palo Alto Research.

In the early 1980s, Fairchild was one of several Silicon Valley tech companies involved in a lawsuit brought on by residents of San Jose, California. The case pertained to industrial solvent contamination of ground water and soil in San Jose's Los Paseos neighborhood. A settlement was reached and the area designated a superfund. Superfund site cleanup ended in 1998.

=== 1990s ===
In 1997, the reconstituted Fairchild Semiconductor was reborn as an independent company, based in South Portland, Maine, with Kirk Pond as CEO.

On March 11, 1997, National Semiconductor Corporation announced the US$550 million sale of a reconstituted Fairchild to the management of Fairchild with the backing of Sterling LLC, a unit of Citicorp Venture Capital. Fairchild carried with it what was mostly the Standard Products group previously segregated by Gil Amelio.

The Fairchild Semiconductor Corporation announced November 27, 1997, that it would acquire the semiconductor division of the Raytheon Corporation for about $120 million in cash. The acquisition was completed on December 31, 1997.

In December 1998, Fairchild announced the acquisition of Samsung's power division, which made power MOSFETs, IGBTs, etc. The deal was finalized in April 1999 for $450 million. To this day, Fairchild remains an important supplier for Samsung.

In August 1999, Fairchild Semiconductor again became a publicly traded company on the New York Stock Exchange with the ticker symbol FCS. Fairchild's South Portland, Maine, and Mountaintop, Pennsylvania, locations are the longest continuously operating semiconductor manufacturing facilities in the world, both operating since 1960.

=== 2000s ===
On March 19, 2001, Fairchild Semiconductor announced that it had completed the acquisition of Intersil Corporation's discrete power business for approximately $338 million in cash. The acquisition moved Fairchild into position as the second-largest power MOSFET supplier in the world, representing a 20 percent share of this $3 billion market that grew 40 percent last year.

On September 6, 2001, Fairchild Semiconductor announced the acquisition of Impala Linear Corporation, based in San Jose, California, for approximately $6 million in stock and cash. Impala brought with it expertise in designing analog power management semiconductors for hand-held devices like laptops, MP3 players, cell phones, portable test equipment and PDAs.

On January 9, 2004, Fairchild Semiconductor CEO Kirk Pond was appointed as a Director of the Federal Reserve Bank of Boston, elected by member banks to serve a three-year term.

On April 13, 2005, Fairchild announced appointment of Mark Thompson as CEO of the corporation. Thompson would also be President, Chief Executive Officer and a member of the board of directors of Fairchild Semiconductor International. He originally joined Fairchild as Executive Vice President, Manufacturing and Technology Group.

On March 15, 2006, Fairchild Semiconductor announced that Kirk P. Pond would retire as Chairman at the company's annual stockholders' meeting on May 3, 2006. Pond would continue as a member of the company’s board of directors. Mark Thompson (then CEO) became Chairman.

On September 1, 2007, New Jersey-based RF semiconductor supplier Anadigics acquired Fairchild Semiconductor's RF design team, located in Tyngsboro, Massachusetts, for $2.4 million.

=== 2010s ===
In April 2011, Fairchild Semiconductor acquired TranSiC, a silicon carbide power transistor company originally based in Sweden.

On November 18, 2015, ON Semiconductor made an offer to acquire Fairchild Semiconductor for $2.4 billion (or $20 per share) after a few months of speculation that Fairchild was seeking a potential buyer.

On April 10, 2016, Fairchild Semiconductor moved its headquarters from San Jose (3030 Orchard Pkwy.) to Sunnyvale (1272 Borregas Ave.).

On September 19, 2016, ON Semiconductor and Fairchild Semiconductor jointly announced that ON Semiconductor had completed its announced $2.4 billion cash acquisition of Fairchild.

In the fall of 2016, the Fairchild 'ON' Semiconductor International closed the West Jordan, Utah, manufacturing plant.

== Landmark status ==
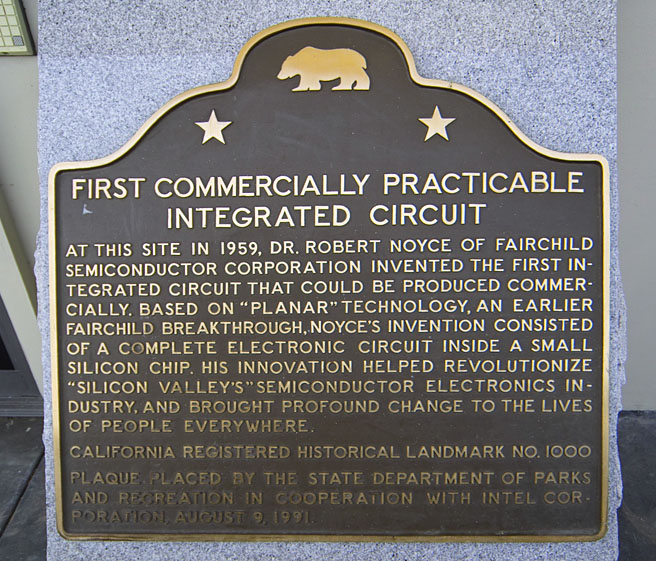
The historic marker at the Fairchild building at which the traitorous eight set up shop and the first commercially practical integrated circuit was invented

On May 8, 1991, the State Historic Preservation Office designated the site of invention of the first commercially practicable integrated circuit as a California historical landmark #1000. A description on the commemorative plaque reads: "At this site in 1959, Dr. Robert Noyce of Fairchild Semiconductor Corporation invented the first integrated circuit that could be produced commercially. Based on 'planar' technology, an earlier Fairchild breakthrough, Noyce's invention consisted of a complete electronic circuit inside a small silicon chip. His innovation helped revolutionize 'Silicon Valley's' semiconductor electronics industry, and brought profound change to the lives of people everywhere."

== Alumni ==
- Gil Amelio
- Julius Blank
- Lee Boysel
- Ron Brachman
- Wilfred Corrigan
- Alan L. Davis
- Richard O. Duda
- James M. Early
- Kirk Ennis
- Federico Faggin
- Jack Gifford
- Victor Grinich
- Andrew Grove
- Peter E. Hart
- Jean Hoerni
- Lester Hogan
- Eugene Kleiner
- Pierre Lamond
- Hector Levesque
- Richard F. Lyon
- Gordon Moore
- Robert Noyce
- Stav Prodromou
- Chih-Tang Sah
- Jerry Sanders
- Ed Turney
- Leslie L. Vadász
- Frank Wanlass
- Bob Widlar
- Andrew Witkin
- Don Valentine

== Fairchildren companies ==
- National Semiconductor
- Rheem semiconductor
- Signetics
- Amelco - Teledyne Semiconductor
- Raytheon Semiconductor
- HP Associates
- Siliconix
- Stewart-Warner Microcircuits
- General Micro-electronics
- Union Carbide Electronics
- Philco Ford Micro-Electronics
- American Micro-Systems
- Cal-Dak
- Electronic Arrays
- Intersil
- Cermetek
- Monsanto Electronics
- Avantek
- Lab-go
- Integrated Systems Technology
- Nortec
- Kinetic Technology
- Intel
- Computer Micro-Technology
- Qualidyne
- Electro Nuclear Labs
- Advanced Memory Systems
- Lithic Systems
- Communications Transistor Corp
- Monolithic Memories
- Cartesian
- Advanced LSI Systems
- Signetics Memory Systems
- Advanced Micro Devices
- Four-Phase Systems
- Precision Monolithics
- Litronix
- Integrated Electronics
- Varadyne
- International Computer Models
- Cal-Tex
- Exar Corporation
- Micro Power
- Intersil Memory
- Standard Microsystems
- Antex
- International Microcircuits
- LSI Systems
- Nitron
- Frontier Electronics
- Interdesign
- Light Emitting Devices
- IC Transducers
- Opto Ray
- Optical Diodes
- Data General
- Synertek
- Monosil
- Zilog
- Mnemonics
- Maruman Integrated Circuits
- Exonix
- Semi Processes
- ITAC
- Supertex
- Cognition
- Integrated Technology Corp
- California Devices
- Oxi Semiconductor
- Universal Semiconductor
- Custom MOS
- Xicor
- VLSI Technology
- Applied Micro Circuits
- LSI Logic
- Harris Microwave Semiconductor
- Integrated Device Technology
- Weitek
- International Microelectronic Products
- SEEQ Technology

== See also ==
- Fairchild Aircraft
