= Sheldon Roberts =

American engineer

- Born: C. Sheldon Roberts; October 27, 1926; Rupert, Vermont, U.S.
- Died: June 6, 2014 (aged 87); McMinnville, Oregon, U.S.
- Education: Rensselaer Polytechnic Institute (B.S., metallurgical engineering, 1948); Massachusetts Institute of Technology, (M.S., 1949; Ph.D., 1952)
- Occupation: Engineer
- Known for: Semiconductor pioneer

C. Sheldon Roberts (October 27, 1926 – June 6, 2014) was an American semiconductor pioneer, and member of the "traitorous eight" who founded Silicon Valley.

== Biography ==
Roberts earned a Bachelor's degree in metallurgical engineering from Rensselaer Polytechnic Institute in 1948, and a Master's degree in 1949 and Ph.D. in 1952, from MIT.

Roberts then worked in research at the Naval Research Lab and the Dow Chemical Company. He joined the seminal Shockley Semiconductor Laboratory division of Beckman Instruments in Mountain View, California, but left the company along with other members of the traitorous eight with the backing of Sherman Fairchild to form the influential Fairchild Semiconductor corporation.

Roberts later founded Amelco (known now as Teledyne) with traitorous eight alumni Jean Hoerni and Jay Last.
