= Eugene Kleiner =

Austrian-American engineer and businessman (1923-2003)

- Born: May 12, 1923; Vienna, Austria
- Died: November 20, 2003 (aged 80); Los Altos Hills, California
- Education: Polytechnic University of New York (B.S., Mechanical Engineering, 1948); New York University (M.S., Industrial Engineering)
- Occupations: Engineer, venture capitalist
- Known for: Semiconductor pioneer
- Spouse: Rose Wassertheil (m. 1947; died 2001)
- Children: Robert; Lisa

Eugene Kleiner (12 May 1923 – 20 November 2003) was an Austrian-American engineer and venture capitalist. He is considered a pioneer of Silicon Valley. He was one of the original founders of Fairchild Semiconductor, part of the Traitorous Eight, and Kleiner Perkins, the Silicon Valley venture capital firm which later became Kleiner Perkins Caufield & Byers. The company was an early investor in more than 300 information technology and biotech firms, including Amazon.com, AOL, Brio Technology, Electronic Arts, Flextronics, Genentech, Google, Hybritech, Intuit, Lotus Development, LSI Logic, Macromedia, Netscape, Quantum, Segway, Sun Microsystems and Tandem Computers.

== Early life and education ==
Kleiner was born on May 12, 1923, in Vienna, Austria. In 1938, he fled Nazi persecution of Jews with his family, arriving in New York two years later. He served in the U.S. Army, then earned a Bachelor's degree in mechanical engineering from the Polytechnic University of New York in 1948 and a Master's degree in industrial engineering from New York University.

== Career ==
After briefly teaching engineering, he joined Western Electric, the manufacturing arm of AT&T Corporation.

In 1956, he was among the first to accept an offer from William Shockley to come to California to help form what became Shockley Semiconductor Laboratory. In 1957, he and seven colleagues (the "Fairchild eight", whom Shockley dubbed the "traitorous eight") left the laboratory to found Fairchild Semiconductor, which most historians mark as the first major spin-off of what later was called Silicon Valley. According to fellow venture capitalist Arthur Rock, Kleiner led the eight, obtaining a $1.5 million investment from Sherman Fairchild and taking over the new firm's administrative duties.

Kleiner later invested his own money in Intel, a semiconductor firm founded in 1968 by fellow Fairchild founders Robert Noyce and Gordon Moore.

In 1972, he joined Hewlett-Packard veteran Tom Perkins to found Kleiner Perkins, the venture capital firm now headquartered on Sand Hill Road. In 1977, the company added Brook Byers and Frank J. Caufield as named partners. He retired from day-to-day responsibilities in the early 1980s.

== Personal life ==
In 1947, he married Rose Wassertheil (d. 2001), a Polish Jewish émigrée. They had two children, Robert and Lisa. He died on November 20, 2003, in Los Altos Hills, California.

== Kleiner's laws ==
- Make sure the dog wants to eat the dog food. No matter how ground-breaking a new technology, how large a potential market, make certain customers actually want it.
- Build one business at a time. Most business plans are overly ambitious. Concentrate on being successful in one endeavor first.
- Risk up front, out early.
- The time to take the tarts is when they're being passed.
- The problem with most companies is they don't know what business they're in.
- Even turkeys can fly in a high wind. In times of strong economies, even bad companies can look good.
- It's easier to get a piece of an existing market than to create a new one.
- It's difficult to see the picture when you're inside the frame.
- After learning some of the tricks of the trade, some people think they know the trade.
- Venture capitalists will stop at nothing to copy success.
- Invest in people, not just products.
- When the money is available, take it.
- There is a time when panic is the appropriate response.
- The more difficult the decision, the less it matters what you choose.
