= Victor Grinich =

American businessman (1924–2000)

- Born: Victor Grgurinovic; November 26, 1924; Aberdeen, Washington
- Died: November 5, 2000 (aged 75); Mountain View, California
- Education: University of Washington; Stanford University
- Occupations: Co-founder of Fairchild Semiconductor; Professor at Stanford & UC Berkeley
- Children: Nicholas P. Grinich; Anita Grinich; Philip Grinich

Victor Henry Grinich (November 26, 1924 – November 5, 2000) was a pioneer in the semiconductor industry and a member of the "traitorous eight" that founded Fairchild Semiconductor in Silicon Valley.

== Early life and education ==
Born to Croatian immigrant parents, his original surname was Grgurinovic. Born in Aberdeen, Washington, he served in the United States Navy during World War II. To make his last name easier to pronounce during military roll calls, he officially changed it to "Grinich".

Grinich received a bachelor's degree from the University of Washington in 1946 and a master's degree in 1949, and then earned a Ph.D. in 1951 from Stanford University.

== Career ==
Initially a researcher at SRI International, he worked at the seminal Shockley Semiconductor Laboratory of Beckman Instruments, and then left with other disgruntled members of the "traitorous eight" to create the influential Fairchild Semiconductor corporation.

Among the physicists, mathematicians and metallurgists in the group, Grinich was the only electrical engineer.

Grinich left Fairchild in 1968 to study computer science while teaching electrical engineering at UC Berkeley. He later taught at Stanford University as well. In 1975, he published a textbook, Introduction to Integrated Circuits.

In 1978, he was appointed chief executive officer of Identronix, a company that pioneered Radio-frequency identification systems, which are now used extensively in anti-theft tags. In 1985, Grinich founded and became CEO of Escort Memory Systems to commercialize RFID tags for industrial applications. EMS was acquired by Datalogic in 1989.

In 1993, he co-founded Arkos Design, a manufacturer of emulators. The company was acquired by Synopsys in 1995. Grinich retired in 1997 and died of prostate cancer in 2000, at age 75.
