= Gordon Moore =

American businessman (1929–2023)

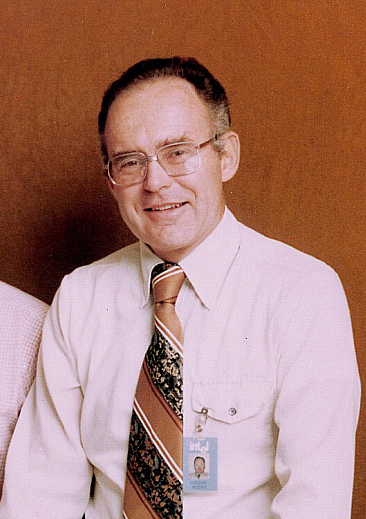
- Moore in 1978
- Born: Gordon Earle Moore; January 3, 1929; Pescadero, California, U.S.
- Died: March 24, 2023 (aged 94); Waimea, Hawaii, U.S.
- Education: San Jose State University; University of California, Berkeley (BS); California Institute of Technology (PhD)
- Known for: Co-founder of Intel; Moore's law; Gordon and Betty Moore Foundation
- Predecessor: Robert Noyce
- Successor: Andy Grove
- Awards: National Medal of Technology (1990); John Fritz Medal (1993); IEEE Founders Medal (1997); Computer History Museum Fellow (1998); Othmer Gold Medal (2001); Presidential Medal of Freedom (2002); Perkin Medal (2004); Nierenberg Prize (2006); IEEE Medal of Honor (2008)
- Scientific career
- Fields: Entrepreneur; Electrical engineering
- Workplaces: Intel; Gordon and Betty Moore Foundation; California Institute of Technology; Johns Hopkins University Applied Physics Laboratory
- Thesis: I. Infrared Studies of Nitrous Acid, The Chloramines and Nitrogen Dioxide; II. Observations Concerning the Photochemical Decomposition of Nitric Oxide (1954)

Signature
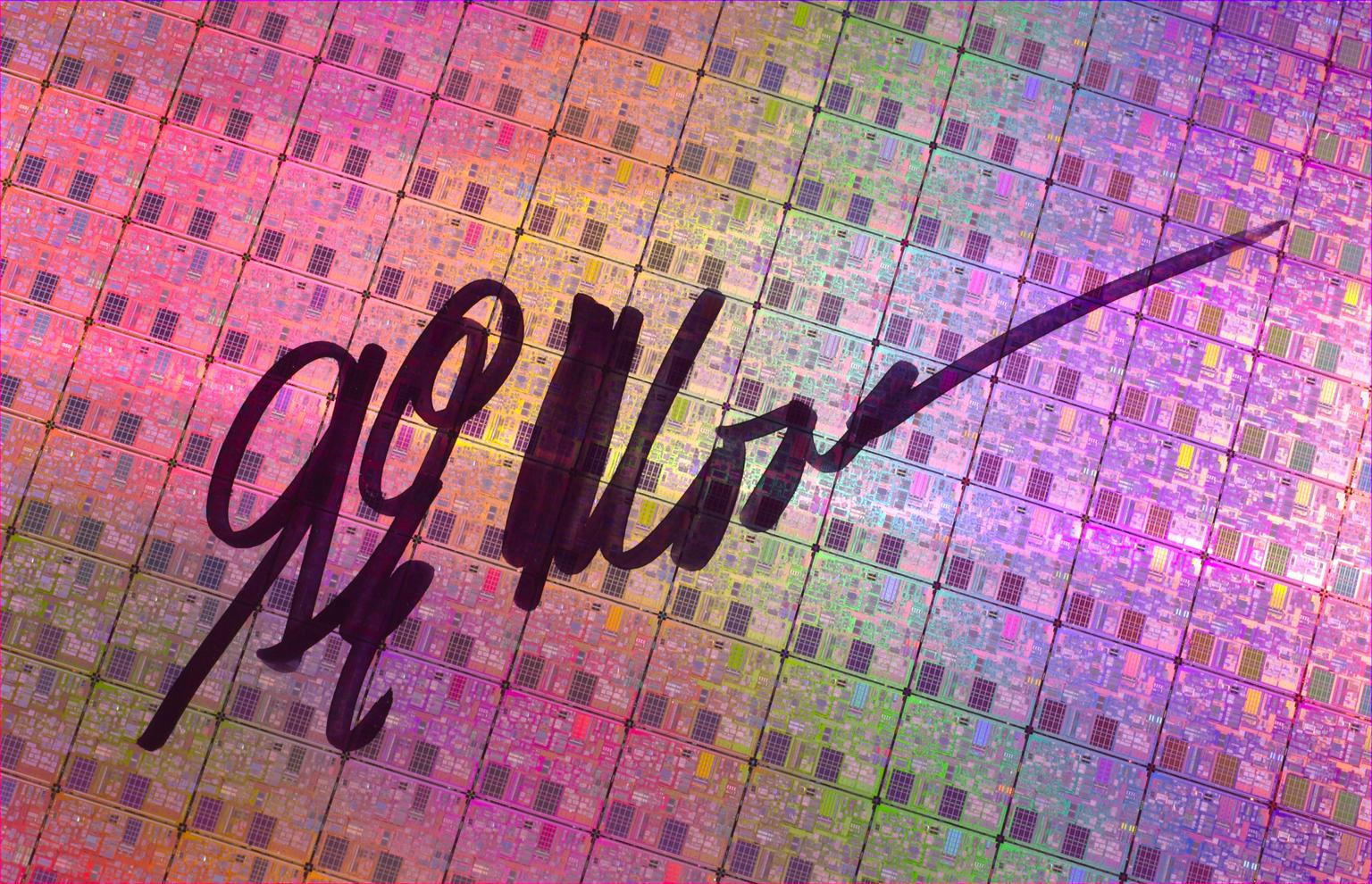

Gordon Earle Moore (January 3, 1929 – March 24, 2023) was an American businessman, scientist, engineer, and the co-founder and emeritus chairman of Intel Corporation. He proposed Moore's law, which makes the observation that the number of transistors in an integrated circuit (IC) doubles about every two years.

== Early life and education ==
Gordon Moore was born in 1929 as the second son of Walter Harold Moore (a constable and later undersheriff in San Mateo County) and Florence Almira "Mira" Williamson (a homemaker). When Moore started school in 1935, the faculty noted his introverted personality. His father accepted a promotion within the San Mateo County sheriff's office in 1939 and moved the family to Redwood City, California. In 1940, Moore received a chemistry set as a Christmas gift, which inspired him to become a chemist. From 1942 to 1946, Moore studied at Sequoia High School, where he was involved in athletic activities.

Moore attended San José State College (San José State University) from 1946 to 1947, studying chemistry. He transferred to University of California, Berkeley in 1948, and graduated in 1950 with a bachelor's degree with a major in chemistry.

Moore studied at the California Institute of Technology from 1950 to 1954, where he has earned a PhD in chemistry in 1954. Moore conducted postdoctoral research at the Applied Physics Laboratory at Johns Hopkins University from 1954 to 1956.

== Scientific career ==
=== Fairchild Semiconductor Laboratory ===
Moore joined MIT and Caltech alumnus William Shockley at the Shockley Semiconductor Laboratory division of Beckman Instruments, but left with the "traitorous eight," when Sherman Fairchild agreed to back them and created the influential Fairchild Semiconductor Corporation.

=== Moore's law ===
In 1965, Moore was working as the director of research and development (R&D) at Fairchild Semiconductor. He was asked by Electronics Magazine to predict what he thought might happen in the semiconductor components industry over the next ten years. In an article published on April 19, 1965, Moore observed that the number of components (transistors, resistors, diodes, or capacitors) in a dense integrated circuit had doubled approximately every year and speculated that it would continue to do so for at least the next ten years. In 1975, he revised the forecast rate to approximately every two years. Carver Mead popularized the phrase "Moore's law". The prediction has become a target for miniaturization in the semiconductor industry and has had widespread impact in many areas of technological change.

=== Intel Corporation ===
In July 1968, Robert Noyce and Moore founded NM Electronics, which later became Intel Corporation. Moore was executive vice president until 1975 when he became president. In April 1979, Moore became chairman and chief executive officer, holding that position until April 1987, when he became chairman. He was named chairman emeritus in 1997. Under Noyce, Moore, and later Andrew Grove, Intel pioneered new technologies for computer memory, integrated circuits, and microprocessor design. On April 11, 2022, Intel renamed its main Oregon site, the Ronler Acres campus in Hillsboro, as 'Gordon Moore Park', and the building formerly known as RA4, as 'Moore Center', after Gordon Moore.

== Philanthropy ==
As of February 2023, Moore's net worth was reported to be $7 billion.

In 2000, Moore and his wife established thf

Gordon and Betty Moore Foundation, with a gift worth about $5 billion. Through the foundation, they initially targeted environmental conservation, science, and the San Francisco Bay Area.

The foundation gives extensively in the area of environmental conservation, supporting major projects in the Andes–Amazon Basin, including Brazil, Bolivia, Peru, Ecuador, Venezuela and Suriname, as well as the San Francisco Bay area. Moore was a director of Conservation International for some years. In 2002, he and Conservation International senior vice president Claude Gascon received the Order of the Golden Ark from Prince Bernhard of the Netherlands for their outstanding contributions to nature conservation.

Moore was a member of Caltech's board of trustees from 1983, chairing it from 1993 to 2000, and was a life trustee at the time of his death. In 2001, Moore and his wife donated $600 million to Caltech, at the time the largest gift ever to an institution of higher education. He said he wanted the gift to be used to keep Caltech at the forefront of research and technology.

In December 2007, Moore and his wife donated $200 million to Caltech and the University of California for the construction of the Thirty Meter Telescope (TMT), expected to become the world's second largest optical telescope once it and the European Extremely Large Telescope are completed in the mid-2020s. The TMT will have a segmented mirror 30 meters across and be built on Mauna Kea in Hawaii. This mirror will be nearly three times the size of the current record holder, the Large Binocular Telescope.

The Moores, as individuals and through their foundation, have also, in a series of gifts and grants beginning in the 1990s, given some $166 million to the University of California, Berkeley to fund initiatives ranging from materials science and physics to genomics and data science.

In addition, through the foundation, his wife created the Betty Irene Moore Nursing Initiative, targeting nursing care in the San Francisco Bay Area and Greater Sacramento. In 2007, the foundation pledged $100 million over 11 years to establish a nursing school at the University of California, Davis. The Moores have also been long-time benefactors of other Northern California institutions, including Stanford University (over $190 million as of 2022), University of California, San Francisco, and University of California, Santa Cruz.

In 2009, the Moores received the Andrew Carnegie Medal of Philanthropy.

In 2020, Forbes deputy wealth editor Jennifer Wang awarded Moore a perfect philanthropy score of 5, the highest possible rating; placing him among an exclusive group of just ten Forbes 400 members, alongside Warren Buffett, George Soros, Eli Broad, and others who have each given away at least 20% of their fortune.

== Scientific awards and honors ==
Moore received many honors. He was elected a member of the National Academy of Engineering in 1976 for contributions to semiconductor devices from transistors to microprocessors.

In 1990, Moore was with the National Medal of Technology and Innovation by President George H. W. Bush, "for his seminal leadership in bringing American industry the two major postwar innovations in microelectronics – large-scale integrated memory and the microprocessor – that have fueled the information revolution".

In 1998, he was inducted as a Fellow of the Computer History Museum "for his fundamental early work in the design and production of semiconductor devices as co-founder of Fairchild and Intel".

In 2001, Moore received the Othmer Gold Medal for outstanding contributions to progress in chemistry and science. Moore was also the recipient of the Presidential Medal of Freedom, the United States' highest civilian honor, as of 2002. He received the award from President George W. Bush. In 2002, Moore received the Bower Award for Business Leadership.

In 2003, Moore was elected a Fellow of the American Association for the Advancement of Science. He was elected to the American Philosophical Society in 2005.

Moore was awarded the 2008 IEEE Medal of Honor for "pioneering technical roles in integrated-circuit processing, and leadership in the development of MOS memory, the microprocessor computer, and the semiconductor industry". Moore was featured in the 2011 documentary film Something Ventured, in which he said about Intel's first business plan, "It was one page, double spaced. It had a lot of typos in it."

In 2009, Moore was inducted into the National Inventors Hall of Fame. He was awarded the 2010 Dan David Prize for his work in the areas of Computers and Telecommunications.

The library at the Centre for Mathematical Sciences at the University of Cambridge is named after him and his wife Betty, as are the Moore Laboratories building (dedicated 1996) at Caltech and the Gordon and Betty Moore Materials Research Building at Stanford. The Electrochemical Society presents an award in Moore's name, the Gordon E. Moore Medal for Outstanding Achievement in Solid State Science and Technology, biennially to celebrate scientists' contributions to the field of solid-state science. The Society of Chemical Industry (American Section) annually presents the Gordon E. Moore Medal, to recognize early career success in innovation in the chemical industries.

Moore was awarded the UCSF medal in 2016.

== Personal life ==
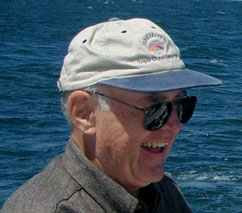
Moore in 2004

Moore met his wife, Betty Irene Whitaker, in 1947 during a student government conference at the Asilomar Conference Grounds. They married in 1950, and Moore became a father to two sons: Kenneth Moore (b. 1954) and Steven Moore (b. 1959).

Moore was an avid fisherman since childhood, and he traveled extensively with his wife, sons, or colleagues to catch species such as bass, marlin, salmon, and trout. He said his conservation efforts were partly inspired by his interest in fishing and his time spent outdoors.

In 2011, Moore's was the first human genome sequenced on Ion Torrent's Personal Genome Machine platform, a massively parallel sequencing device, which uses ISFET biosensors.

Moore died at his home in Waimea, Hawaii on March 24, 2023, aged 94. He was remembered by the San Francisco Chronicle as a "Silicon Valley icon who co-founded Intel". The Intel CEO at the time, Pat Gelsinger, remembered him as someone who, "defined the technology industry through his insight and vision".

Business positions
| Preceded by Robert Noyce | CEO, Intel; 1975–1987 | Succeeded by Andrew Grove |
