= Fairchild Camera and Instrument =

Defunct American company

Fairchild Camera and Instrument Corporation
- Type: Private
- Industry: Aerial cameras
- Founded: 1927
- Founder: Sherman Fairchild
- Defunct: 1979
- Headquarters: Mountain View, California, United States
- Area served: Worldwide
- Key people: Sherman Fairchild
- Products: Fairchild Aerial Camera manufactured aerial cameras for military, commercial aerial mapping, And the Fairchild Channel F

Fairchild Camera and Instrument Corporation was a company founded by Sherman Fairchild. It was based on the East Coast of the United States, and provided research and development for flash photography equipment. The technology was primarily used for DOD spy satellites. The firm was later known for its manufacture of semiconductors.

== History ==
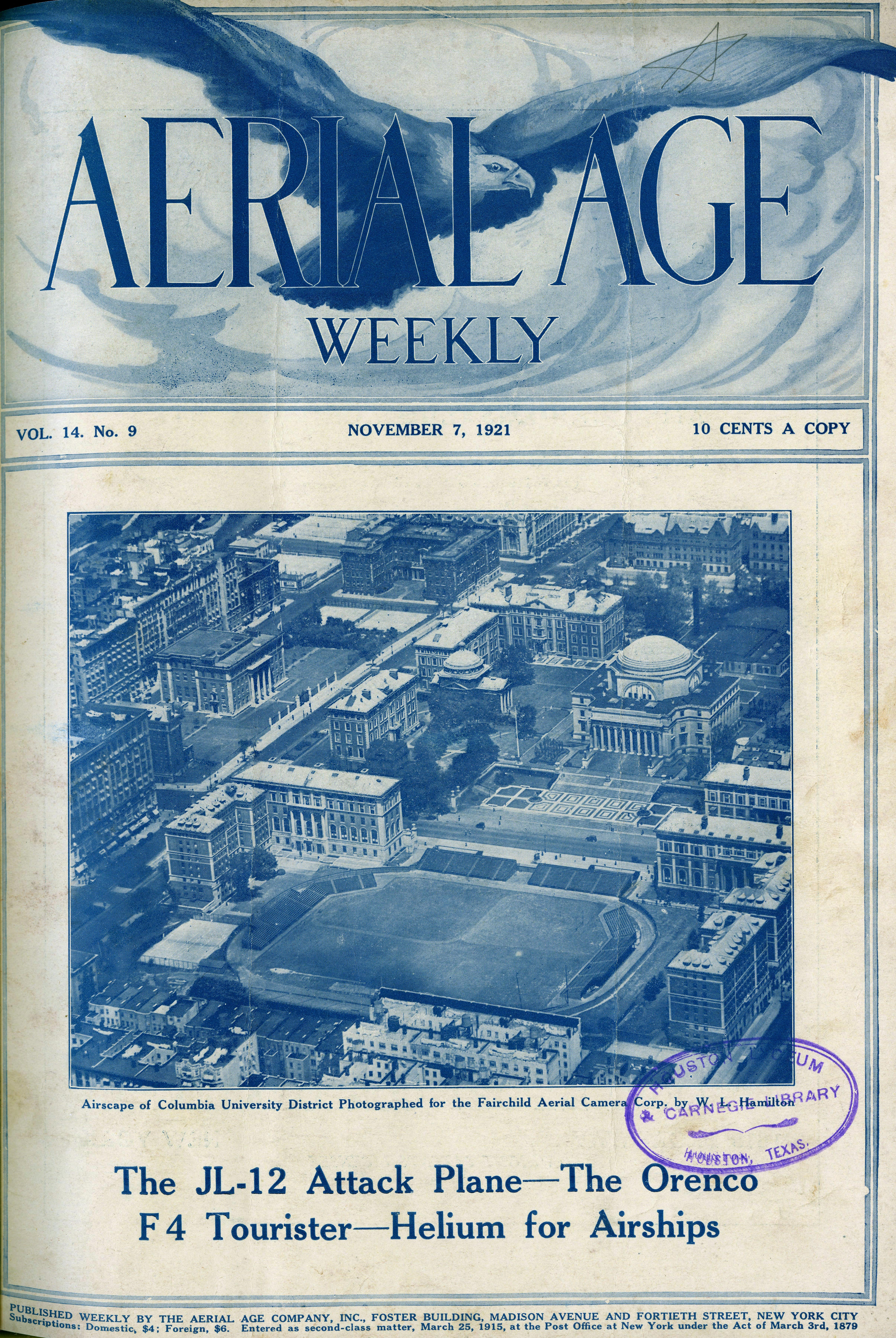
Aerial Age Nov. 7 1921, magazine cover with aerial photo of Columbia University shot by W. L. Hamilton for Fairchild Aerial Camera Corp.

=== Fairchild Aviation Corporation ===
Fairchild Camera and Instrument was incorporated in Delaware in 1927 as the Fairchild Aviation Corporation (also see Fairchild Aircraft), which comprised seven aircraft businesses that were the outgrowth of Fairchild Aerial Camera Corporation, which had been incorporated in 1920. The merger made Fairchild Aviation the second-largest manufacturer of commercial airplanes and the fourth-largest aviation organization in the United States.

Fairchild Aerial Camera manufactured aerial cameras for military and commercial aerial mapping that were used in Russia, Poland, and throughout South America. They were the official cameras of the United States Army and Navy Air Services.

=== Fairchild Camera and Instrument Corporation ===
In 1944, Fairchild changed the company name from Fairchild Aviation to Fairchild Camera and Instrument Corporation. Its product portfolio expanded during World War II from aerial photography equipment to include machine gun cameras, x-ray cameras, radar cameras, gun synchronizers, and radio compasses.

After the war, military sales still represented a large portion of Fairchild's revenue. The company won a U.S. Air Force contract for the C-82 Packet cargo and troop-carrying airplanes and spare parts. The company then began to develop products for the commercial sector such as manufacturing x-ray equipment. In 1948, the company introduced the Fairchild Lithotype for the newspaper and publishing industry. It was described as "a revolutionary machine that types standard printers' type in a great variety of faces and sizes."

During the 1950s, Fairchild invested heavily in research and development, and introduced new products that ranged from devices combining radar and photography for training pilots to automatic corrected color engraving machines. In 1958 it developed high-speed processing equipment for motion pictures that could develop 500 feet of film almost instantly.

The Fairchild Company in America introduced in the early 1960s a range of Cinephonic cameras. They used pre-striped Standard 8 film. The amplifier was transistorised and the sound separation was 56 frames. The entire system was run by a rechargeable 12-volt nickel-cadmium battery that was reputed to shoot and record 800 ft of film without being recharged. The camera took 8 mm film in 100 ft reels which gave five and a half minutes shooting at a speed of 24 fps.

=== Fairchild Semiconductor ===
In 1957, the company was approached by members of the "traitorous eight" to rescue the group from the authoritarian regime of William Shockley. With help from Arthur Rock Sherman Fairchild agreed to provide the venture capital to launch a division of Fairchild called Fairchild Semiconductor, from which would spawn dozens of semiconductors and Silicon Valley.

In 1960, two years after Emerson Radio had acquired DuMont's TV manufacturing division (in 1958), Fairchild acquired the remnants of Allen B. DuMont Laboratories (oscillograph & cathode-ray tube manufacturing), as well as large interest in Società Generale Semiconduttori, an Italian semiconductor producer. Throughout the 1960s and 1970s, it acquired several companies in various industries: printing, sensors and magnetic heads, precision optical and photographic equipment, water quality monitoring equipment, and precision molding equipment.

Its corporate headquarters were in Syosset, New York, which were later moved to Mountain View, California, when Lester Hogan assumed control of Fairchild Semiconductor.

=== Fairchild Systems ===
In 1979, Fairchild Camera and Instrument (including Fairchild Semiconductor) became a subsidiary of Schlumberger. Schlumberger sold Fairchild Semiconductor to National Semiconductor in 1987; National Semiconductor was then acquired by Texas Instruments in 2011. The rest of Fairchild was renamed Fairchild Weston Systems in 1982, which was bought by Loral Corporation in 1989. The company was then renamed as the Loral Fairchild Systems division of Loral Corp.

In 1996, Lockheed Martin completed the acquisition of Loral Corporation's defense electronics and system integration businesses, which included Fairchild, for $9.1 billion. The company became Lockheed Fairchild Systems.

In 2000, Lockheed Martin grouped Fairchild with Sanders Associates and Lockheed Martin Space Electronics & Communications under the Lockheed Martin Aerospace Electronic Systems division. BAE Systems agreed to acquire the division in July 2000 and completed its acquisition on in November.

=== Fairchild Imaging ===
In 2001, the Carlyle Group reached an agreement with BAE to spin out Fairchild's imaging sensors division as an independent private company called Fairchild Imaging. In 2011, BAE Systems purchased Fairchild Imaging from the Carlyle Group. It is based in Milpitas, California, about twelve miles away from the site where Fairchild Semiconductor was founded.
