= Beckman Coulter =

American corporation

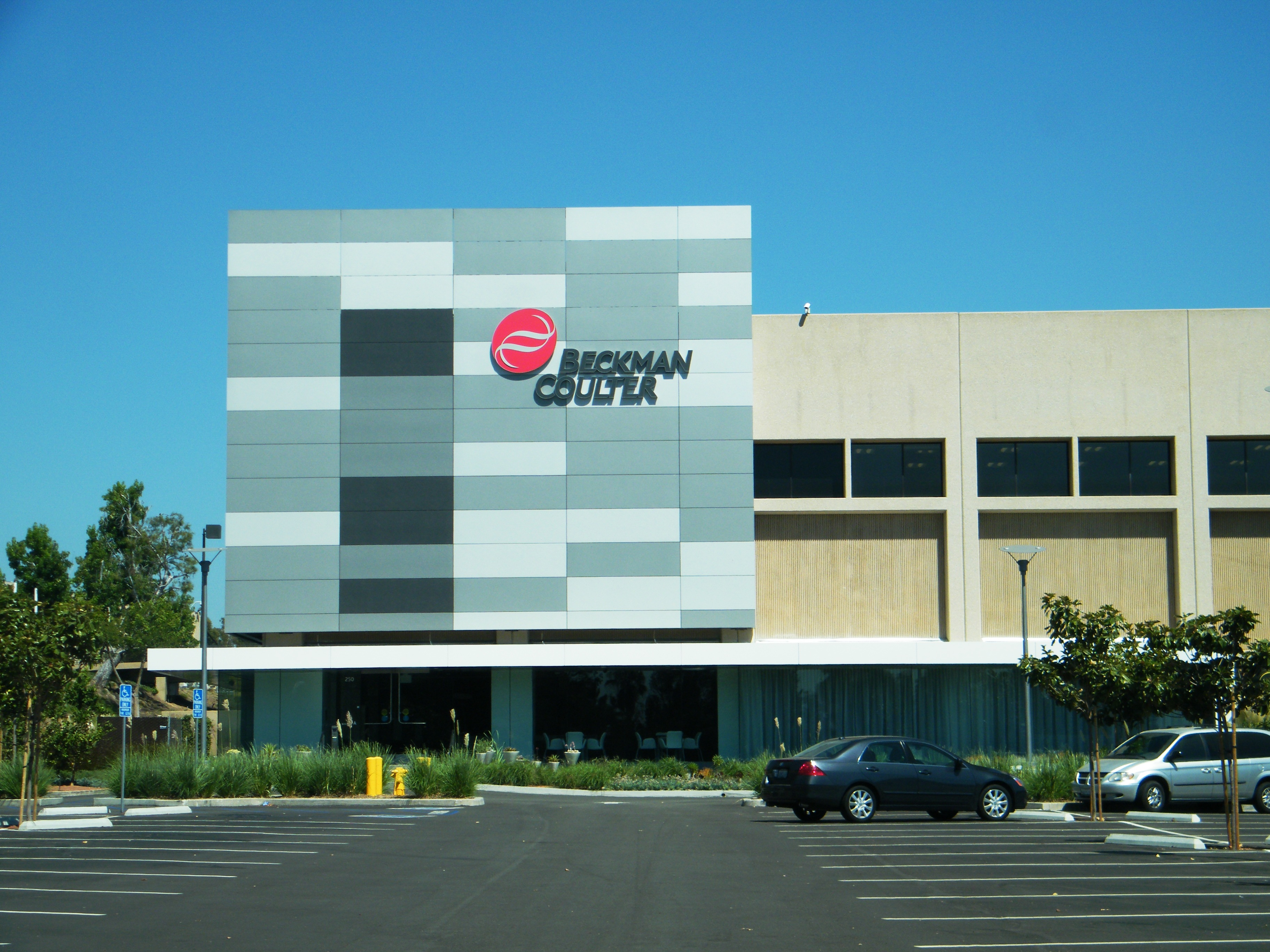
- Beckman Coulter headquarters in Brea
- Formerly: National Technical Laboratories
- Type: Subsidiary
- Industry: Scientific instruments, Medical Devices
- Founded: Pasadena, California 1935; 91 years ago
- Founder: Arnold O. Beckman
- Headquarters: Brea, California, United States
- Area served: Worldwide
- Key people: Julie Sawyer Montgomery, President Diagnostics, Suzanne Foster, President Life Sciences
- Products: Biomek platforms, Synchron/AU analyzers, IRIS Immunochemistry system, VERIS, DxI immunoassay instruments, DxC chemistry instruments, DxH hematology instruments, Hemoccult, CEQ 2000 DNA Analysis System, Flow cytometers, Ultracentrifuge, Laboratory centrifuge
- Revenue: ▲US$3.66B (FY 2010)
- Operating income: ▲US$405M (FY 2010)
- Net income: ▲US$231M (FY 2010)
- Total assets: ▲US$4.88B (FY 2010)
- Total equity: ▲US$2.13B (FY 2010)
- Number of employees: 12,000 (Worldwide)
- Parent: Danaher Corporation
- Divisions: Beckman Coulter Diagnostics; Beckman Coulter Life Sciences
- Website: www.beckmancoulter.com; www.beckman.com

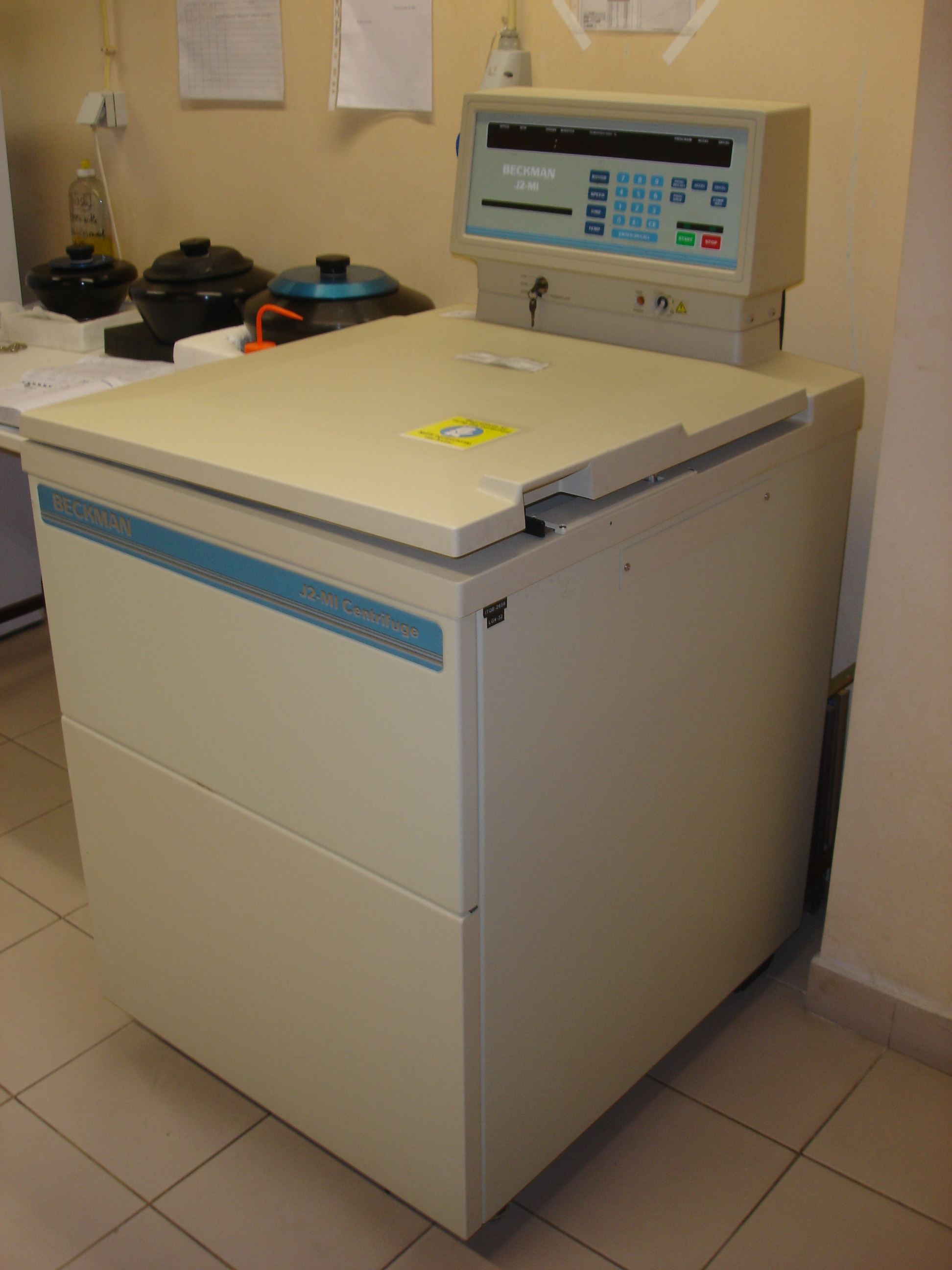
A large laboratory centrifuge from Beckman Coulter Life Sciences

Beckman Coulter, Inc. is an American company that develops, manufactures, and markets products relevant to biomedical testing. It has been a subsidiary of Danaher Corporation since 2011. It operates in the industries of diagnostics under the brand name Beckman Coulter and life sciences under the brand name Beckman Coulter Life Sciences. The company was established in 1935 as National Technical Laboratories, and has become an international company through growth and acquisitions of other life sciences organizations.

The company employs over 12,000 people, with $5.8 billion in annual sales by 2017. It is currently headquartered in Brea, California. Beckman Coulter was acquired by Danaher Corporation in 2011.

== History ==
The company was founded by Caltech professor Arnold O. Beckman in 1935 as National Technical Laboratories to commercialize a pH meter that he had invented. In the 1940s, the name was changed the name to Arnold O. Beckman, Inc. to sell oxygen analyzers, the Helipot precision potentiometer, and spectrophotometers. The company name changed to Beckman Instruments, Inc. before going public in 1952. Beckman Instruments then acquired ultracentrifuge maker Spinco (Specialized Instruments Corp.) in 1954. The Spinco division went on to design and manufacture a broad range of laboratory centrifuges. In the 1950s, Beckman Instruments developed the EASE series of analog computers, two of which were used by NASA in the 1960s for real-time simulation during the development of the Apollo Guidance Computer.

In 1982, the company merged into SmithKline to form SmithKline Beckman, with Arnold Beckman as vice chairman, but regained its independence in 1989 after SmithKline merged with Beecham Group to form SmithKline Beecham (now part of GlaxoSmithKline). Following the acquisition of Hybritech, Inc. from Eli Lilly in 1985 and Sanofi of Sanofi Pasteur Diagnostics in 1996, the company acquired Coulter Corporation in 1998, a company founded by Wallace H. Coulter, the inventor of the Coulter counter. The merged company became Beckman Coulter. Following the company's acquisition of the Lab-based Diagnostics business of Olympus Corporation Japan in 2009, Beckman Coulter moved its world headquarters from Fullerton, California to a newly renovated facility in Brea.

In February 2011, Danaher announced that it has entered into a definitive merger agreement with Beckman Coulter. On June 30, 2011, Danaher finalized the acquisition of Beckman Coulter. One year later, Danaher acquired Iris Diagnostics and its parent company IRIS International, Inc. as leader in Urinalysis Diagnostic to further boost Danaher's Diagnostic business within Beckman Coulter.

== Division after Danaher acquisition ==
In 2011, following its acquisition by Danaher Corporation, Beckman Coulter was reorganized into two separate business units. Beckman Coulter Diagnostics, based in Brea, California, handles diagnostic systems and laboratory solutions. Beckman Coulter Life Sciences, based in Indianapolis, Indiana, provides instruments and reagents for biomedical research and related markets.

In 2022, Beckman Coulter Life Sciences acquired ValitaCell Ltd., a biotechnology company based in Dublin, Ireland, known for its analytical products used in biopharmaceutical development. Beckman Coulter Life Sciences established a strategic collaboration with Hombrechtikon Systems Engineering AG (HSE- AG), a Swiss automation solutions provider, to integrate nucleic acid quantification into automated liquid handling workflows in 2025.
