= Planar process =

Process used to make microchips

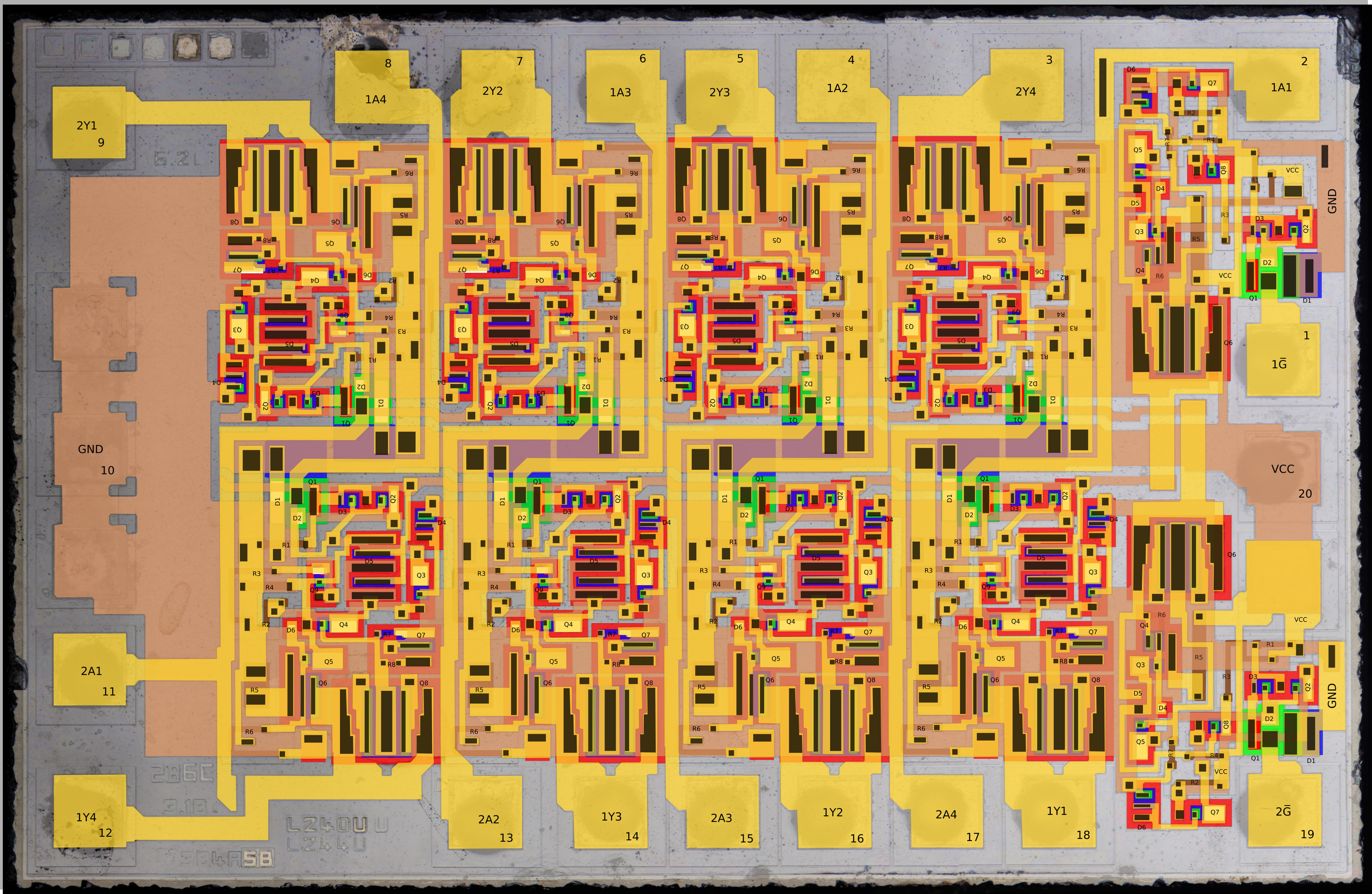
Annotated die photo of a Fairchild chip

The planar process is a manufacturing process used in the semiconductor industry to build individual components of a transistor, and in turn, connect those transistors together. It is the primary process by which silicon integrated circuit chips are built, and it is the most commonly used method of producing junctions during the manufacture of semiconductor devices. The process utilizes the surface passivation and thermal oxidation.

The planar process was developed at Fairchild Semiconductor in 1959 and it proved to be one of the most important single advances in semiconductor technology.

== Overview ==
The key concept is to view a circuit in its two-dimensional projection (a plane), thus allowing the use of photographic processing concepts such as film negatives to mask the projection of light exposed chemicals. This allows the use of a series of exposures on a substrate (silicon) to create silicon oxide (insulators) or doped regions (conductors). Together with the use of metallization, and the concepts of p–n junction isolation and surface passivation, it is possible to create circuits on a single silicon crystal slice (a wafer) from a monocrystalline silicon boule.

The process involves the basic procedures of silicon dioxide (SiO_{2}) oxidation, SiO_{2} etching and heat diffusion. The final steps involves oxidizing the entire wafer with an SiO_{2} layer, etching contact vias to the transistors, and depositing a covering metal layer over the oxide, thus connecting the transistors without manually wiring them together.

== History ==
=== Development ===
In 1955 at Bell Labs, Carl Frosch and Lincoln Derick accidentally grew a layer of silicon dioxide over a silicon wafer, for which they observed surface passivation properties. In 1957, Frosch and Derick were able to manufacture the first silicon dioxide field effect transistors, the first transistors in which drain and source were adjacent at the surface, showing that silicon dioxide surface passivation protected and insulated silicon wafers.

At Bell Labs, the importance of Frosch's technique was immediately realized. Results of theirs circulated around Bell Labs in the form of BTL memos before being published in 1957. At Shockley Semiconductor, Shockley had circulated the preprint of their article in December 1956 to all his senior staff, including Jean Hoerni. Later, Hoerni attended a meeting where Atalla presented a paper about passivation based on the previous results at Bell Labs. Taking advantage of silicon dioxide's passivating effect on the silicon surface, Hoerni proposed to make transistors that were protected by a layer of silicon dioxide.

Jean Hoerni, while at Fairchild Semiconductor, first patented the planar process in 1959. K. E. Daburlos and H. J. Patterson of Bell Laboratories continued on the efforts of C. Frosch and L. Derick, and developed a process similar to Hoerni’s about the same time. Together with the use of metallization (to join together the integrated circuits), and the concept of p–n junction isolation (from Kurt Lehovec), the researchers at Fairchild were able to create circuits on a single silicon crystal slice (a wafer) from a monocrystalline silicon boule.

In 1959, Robert Noyce built on Hoerni's work with his conception of an integrated circuit (IC), which added a layer of metal to the top of Hoerni's basic structure to connect different components, such as transistors, capacitors, or resistors, located on the same piece of silicon. The planar process provided a powerful way of implementing an integrated circuit that was superior to earlier conceptions of the integrated circuit. Noyce's invention was the first monolithic IC chip.

Early versions of the planar process used a photolithography process using near-ultraviolet light from a mercury vapor lamp. As of 2011, small features are typically made with 193 nm "deep" UV lithography. As of 2022, the ASML NXE platform uses 13.5 nm extreme ultraviolet (EUV) light, generated by a tin-based plasma source, as part of the extreme ultraviolet lithography process.

== See also ==
- Semiconductor device fabrication
