= Geoffrey Dummer =

20th-century English electronics engineer

Geoffrey Dummer MBE FIEE CEng FIEEE
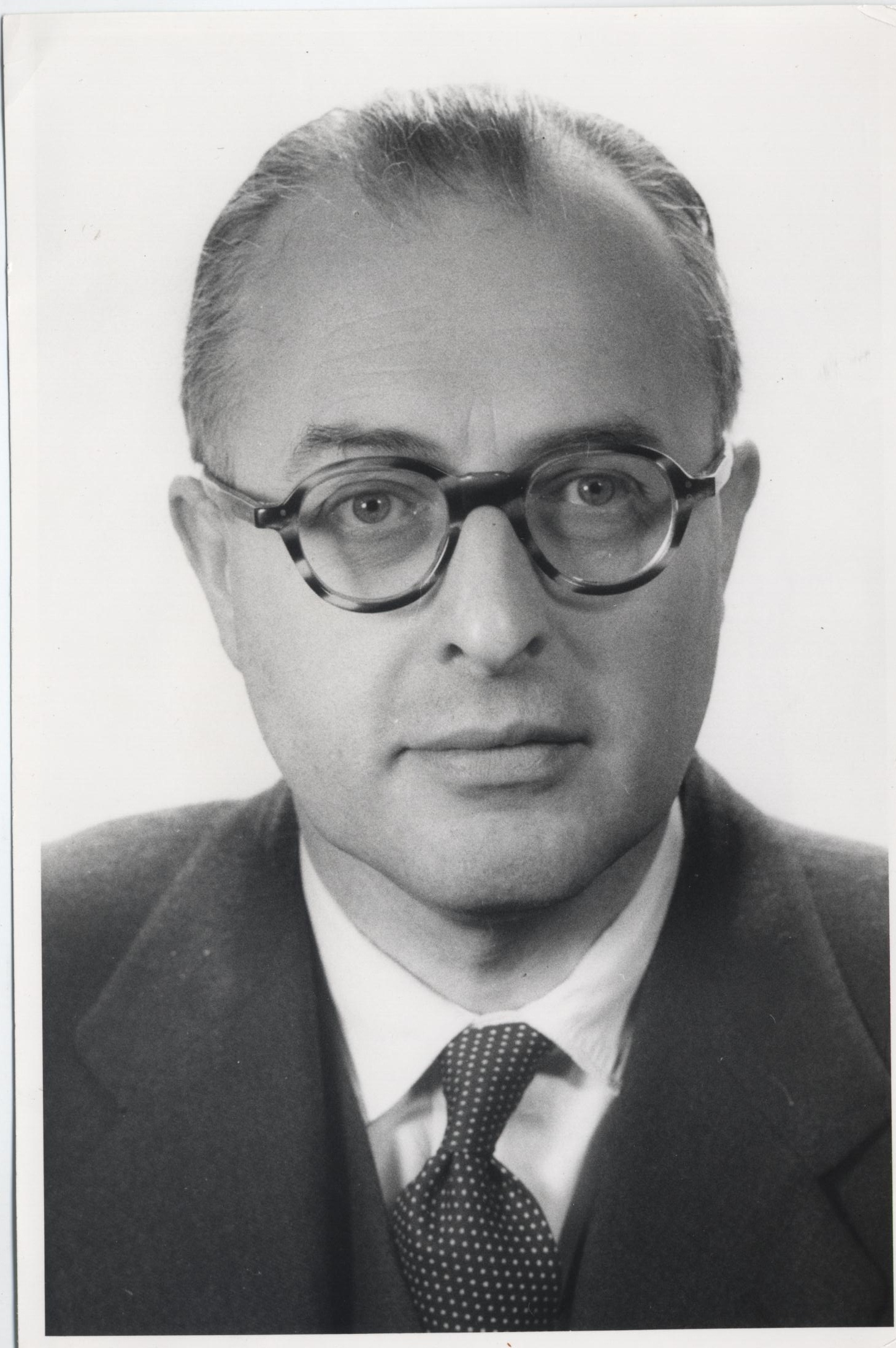
- Geoffrey Dummer in September 1955
- Born: 25 February 1909; Hull, Yorkshire, England
- Died: 9 September 2002 (aged 93); Malvern
- Education: Manchester College of Technology
- Scientific career
- Fields: Electronic engineering

Geoffrey William Arnold Dummer (25 February 1909 – 9 September 2002) was an English electronics engineer and consultant, who is credited as being the first person to popularise the concepts that ultimately led to the development of the integrated circuit, commonly called the microchip, in the late 1940s and early 1950s. Dummer passed the first radar trainers and became a pioneer of reliability engineering at the Telecommunications Research Establishment in Malvern in the 1940s. Dummer studied electrical engineering at Manchester College of Technology starting in the early 1930s. By the early 1940s he was working at the Telecommunications Research Establishment in Malvern (later to become the Royal Radar Establishment).

His work with colleagues at TRE led him to the belief that it would be possible to fabricate multiple circuit elements on and into a substance like silicon. In 1952 he became one of the first people to speak publicly on the topic of integrated circuits, presenting his conceptual work at a conference in Washington, DC. As a result, he has been called "the prophet of the integrated circuit".

Dummer was admitted to a nursing home in Malvern in 2000 due to a stroke and died in September 2002, aged 93.

== Life ==
=== Early years ===
G. W. A. Dummer was born in Hull, Yorkshire, England, 25 February 1909, and educated at Sale High School and Manchester College of Technology. His first job was with Mullard Radio Valve Company in 1931 examining defective valves returned by customers to establish the cause of failure, the company's aim being to attribute the cause to rough handling to avoid having to supply free replacements. Technicians were expected to process up to 1000 valves per day.

In 1935 he moved to A. C. Cossor Ltd to work on cathode ray tubes, time bases and circuits. In 1938 he moved to Salford Electrical Instruments and worked in the high-frequency laboratories. The following year he joined the Ministry of Defence as a Technical Officer on a salary of £275 per annum and worked with the team under R. J. Dippy on time bases at the Air Ministry Research Establishment (later known as the Telecommunications Research Establishment [TRE], the Royal Radar Establishment (RRE), Malvern and the Royal Signals and Radar Establishment). The group was responsible for the first plan position indicator (PPI) ever built, and they were granted two patents for their work.

=== Second World War ===
The pace of development increased dramatically during the early war years for the personnel of RRE, Malvern, and a close working relationship was established with the Royal Air Force. In 1942 Geoffrey Dummer started a Synthetic Trainer Design Group and was responsible for the design, manufacture, installation and servicing of over 70 types of radar training equipment for service use during the war. In 1943 he visited the United States and Canada to advise on trainers and to help set up similar training devices in the USA.

=== The drive for component reliability ===
In 1944 he had been made Divisional Leader of the Physical & Tropical Testing Laboratories and the Component Group, which placed contracts with industry for new components and materials. His interest in components grew out of his experience with radar. "They were the bricks and mortar, and many of them were not as reliable as they should have been", he said. Out of his drive for reliability came the search for new techniques and methods of construction. Together with Dr A. C. Vivian he made the first plastic potted circuit in January 1947 to protect components from shock and moisture. Printed wiring methods and etching techniques were explored, and their use encouraged in radar equipment.

=== The integrated circuit ===
On May 7, 1952 Geoffrey Dummer read a paper at the US Electronic Components Symposium. At the end of the paper he made the statement: "With the advent of the transistor and the work on semi-conductors generally, it now seems possible to envisage electronic equipment in a solid block with no connecting wires. The block may consist of layers of insulating, conducting, rectifying and amplifying materials, the electronic functions being connected directly by cutting out areas of the various layers".

This is now generally accepted as the first public description of an integrated circuit. At a later date he said:

It seemed so logical to me; we had been working on smaller and smaller components, improving reliability as well as size reduction. I thought the only way we could ever attain our aim was in the form of a solid block. You then do away with all your contact problems, and you have a small circuit with high reliability. And that is why I went on with it. I shook the industry to the bone. I was trying to make them realise how important its invention would be for the future of microelectronics and the national economy.

His ability to turn his idea of an integrated circuit into practical reality was restricted by his lack of responsibility for active devices and the lack of suitable manufacturing techniques. He got over his lack of suitable authority to commission development work by placing a small contract with Plessey under the auspices of his Constructional Techniques Group. The result was shown at The International Components Symposium he initiated at RRE Malvern in September 1957, where he presented a model to illustrate the possibilities of solid-circuit techniques. The model represented a flip-flop in the form of a solid block of semiconductor material suitably doped and shaped to form four transistors. Four resistors were represented by silicon bridges, and other resistors and capacitors were deposited in film form directly onto the silicon block with intervening insulating films. The model was intended as a design exercise, but was not too different from the circuit patented by Jack St. Clair Kilby two years later.

Dummer made no claim to be the inventor of microelectronics, a role he assigned to Robert Noyce and Jean Hoerni, whose planar process turned Kilby's initial prototype into a reliable manufacturable product, which is what Dummer had been waiting for. He began a campaign to encourage substantial UK investment in IC development, but was met largely with apathy. The UK military failed to perceive any operational requirements for ICs, and UK companies were unwilling to invest their own money. He later said: "I have attributed it to war-weariness in one of my books, but that is perhaps an excuse. The plain fact is that nobody would take the risk. The Ministry wouldn't place a contract because they hadn't an application. The applications people wouldn't say we want it because they had no experience with it. It was a chicken-and-egg situation. The Americans took financial gambles, whereas this was very slow in this country". It was years before the UK had a significant semiconductor industry.

=== Later years ===
His knowledge and experience of components, their design, construction, application, and reliability had become widely recognised. He liaised with numerous international organisations and authorities. He served on many committees worldwide, both as member and chairman. He appeared on the popular BBC Television programme Tomorrow's World, extolling the virtues of integrated circuits. In 1964 he sponsored a symposium on Electronic Beam Techniques for Microelectronics at RRE. He produced numerous books on electronic equipment, inventions and discoveries, components and reliability, for several publishing houses, including McGraw-Hill, Pitman and notably, Pergamon Press, whose Electronic Data Series ran to 39 volumes. His retirement as Superintendent of Applied Physics in 1966 allowed him to take up the role of a consultant, as well as continuing to add to his numerous published works. He was Editor-in-Chief of Pergamon's International Journal Microelectronics and Reliability, which he had founded, and Editorial Adviser to Electronic Components (United Trade Press).

His wife Dorothy died in 1992, and he married again, to June, who survived him. As a result of a stroke in 1999, he spent his last two and a half years at Perrins House, Malvern. He died in September 2002 and was interred in Malvern Cemetery.

=== Family history ===
Geoffrey William Arnold Dummer was born 25 February 1909 at Kingston upon Hull, England, the son of Arthur Robert William Dummer, a caretaker, and Daisy Maria King. Geoffrey married Dorothy Whitelegg in 1934, the marriage being registered at Bucklow. Their only son, Stephen John, was born in 1945 at Bearsted, Kent.

In May 1966 Geoffrey was contacted by Michael Dummer, who had started a study of all Dummers, concerning Geoffrey's family history. At that time Geoffrey knew almost nothing of his ancestors before his grandparents, but was stimulated to start researching them. He was particularly hopeful of establishing a link with the notable Dummer family who had held estates in Hampshire in the 15th, 16th and 17th centuries, and who included in their number Edmund Dummer, Surveyor of The Navy, and Richard Dummer, one of the founding fathers of Massachusetts.

His researches were to lead him in a different direction, however. His father had been born at the City Gaol, Gorton, where his grandfather, Moses Dummer, was gaoler. Geoffrey found out that Moses was born in the village of Lacock, Wiltshire. A search through the parish registers at Lacock revealed a long line of Dummers stretching back to 1559, and although it was not possible to positively prove his own line beyond Robert Dummer of 1732, it was obvious that his roots stretched a long way back at Lacock. The names Moses, Robert and Ephraim were a recurrent feature. Like others at Lacock, many of the family had been weavers, and the little packhorse bridge near the church had at one time been known as Dummer's Bridge. Sadly, Geoffrey's only son, Stephen, a Merchant Navy officer, was drowned in Mombasa in 1983, terminating Geoffrey's interest in family history, and he passed his papers to Michael Dummer.

== Achievements ==
=== Occupations ===
- Head of a specialist team of component fields at the Radar Research Establishment.
- Member of the Joint Services Radio Components Research and Development Technical Committee.
- Member of the Radio Components Standardization Committee.
- Chairman of the R.C.R.D. Panel on Transistor Components.
- Chairman of the R.C.R.D. sub-committee on Fixed and Variable Resistors.
- Chairman of the NATO sub-committee on standardization of Resistors.
- Represents the United Kingdom on the NATO sub-committee for the standardization of Capacitors.

=== Honours ===
- M.B.E. (Member of the Order of the British Empire) for work on radar synthetic trainers, 1945.
- American Medal of Freedom (with Bronze Palm) for work on radar synthetic trainers.
- Wakefield Gold Medal of the Royal Aeronautical Society for his contribution to air safety through microelectronic reliability (1964).
- Honorary Citizen of the State of Colorado for his participation by transatlantic telephone in the Electronic Circuit Packaging Symposium at the University of Colorado (1964).
- The IEEE Cledo Brunetti Award for his work on microelectronic components.

=== Published works ===
==== Books ====
- Fixed Capacitors (Pitman 1956)
- Fixed Resistors (Pitman 1956)
- Variable Resistors and Potentiometers (Pitman 1956)
- Variable Capacitors and Trimmers (Pitman 1957)
- Electronic Equipment Reliability (with N. Griffin) (Pitman/Wiley 1960)
- Fixed & Variable Capacitors (with H. M. Nordenburg) (McGraw-Hill 1960)
- Microminiaturization: Proceedings of the AGARD Conference 1961 (Pergamon 1961)
- Miniature & Microminiature Electronics (with J. Wiley Granville) (Pitman 1961)
- Electronic Equipment Design & Construction (with Cledo Brunetti & Low K. Lee) (McGraw-Hill 1961)
- Wires & R.F. Cables (with W. T. Blackband) (Pitman 1961)
- Environmental Testing Techniques for Electronics & Materials (Pergamon 1962)
- British Transistor Diode & Semiconductor Devices Annual 1962–63 (with J. Mackenzie-Robertson) (Pergamon 1962)
- Electronic Components, Tubes and Transistors (Pergamon 1963)
- World Lists of Electronic & Component Specifications (1963 & later) (with J. Mackenzie-Robertson)
- Solid Circuits & Miniaturization – Proceedings of the Conference held at West Ham College of Technology June 1963 (Macmillan/Pergamon 1964)
- Proceedings of the First Microelectronics Lecture Course (United Trade, London 1965)
- Electronics Reliability – Calculations & Design (Commonwealth & International Library 1966)
- Modern Electronic Components (NY Philosophical Lib. 1959, Pitman 1966)
- Japanese Miniature Electronic Components Data 1966–67 (Pergamon 1966)
- Connectors, Relays & Switches (with N. E. Hyde) (Pitman 1966)
- Medical Electronics Equipment 1966–67 (with J. Mackenzie-Robertson) (eds) (also later editions)
- Educational Electronics Equipment 1966–67 (Pergamon 1967)
- Fluidic Components & Equipment 1968–69 (Pergamon 1968)
- Anglo-American Microelectronics Data (1968) (with J. Mackenzie-Robertson)
- German Miniature Electronic Components & Assemblies Data (1968)
- Electronic Connections, Techniques and Equipment (Pergamon 1969) (with J. Mackenzie-Robertson)
- Materials for Conductive and Resistive Functions (Hayden 1970)
- Automobile Electronic Equipment 1970–71 (Pergamon)
- Banking Automation (1971)
- Electronic Inventions 1745–1976 (Elsevier 1976, Pergamon 1977)
- Semiconductor & Microprocessor Technology – Selected Papers Presented at the SEMINEX Technical Seminar (Elsevier 1978)
- Electronic Inventions and Discoveries: Electronics from Its Earliest Beginnings to the present Day (Ifac Proceedings Series) (Pergamon 1983)
- The Timetable of Technology (ed) (Hearst 1982)
- An Elementary Guide to Reliability (Butterworth-Heinemann 1997) (later editions with R. C. Winton and Michael H. Tooley).
- Newnes Dictionary of Electronics (Newnes 1999) (with S. W. Amos and Roger Amos)
- The Electronics Book List (with J. Mackenzie-Robertson)

==== Journals ====
- (International Journal) Microelectronics and Reliability (Elsevier Science) – Founding editor
