= James L. Buie =

American scientist and inventor (1920–1988)

- Buie, c. 1964
- Born: 1920; Hollywood, California, US
- Died: September 23, 1988 (aged 68)
- Education: University of Southern California
- Known for: transistor-to-transistor logic (TTL); transistor-coupled transistor logic (TCTL)
- Awards: The United States Distinguished Flying Cross
- Scientific career
- Fields: Electrical Engineering
- Workplaces: TRW Inc.; Pacific Semiconductors (PSI); Ramo-Woolridge Corporation

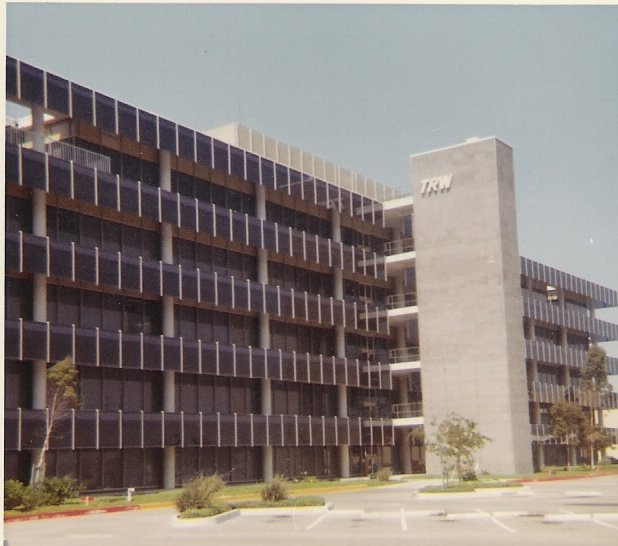
TRW research building E1 in 1967. Buie did some of his research here.

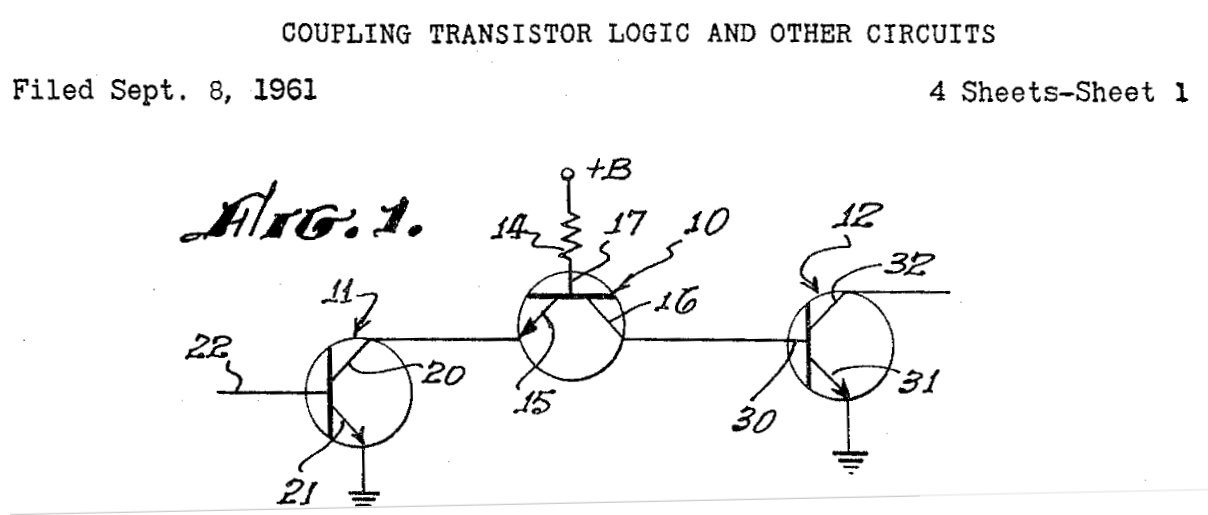
Buie "TTL" transistor technology

James L. Buie (1920 – September 23, 1988) was an American scientist and inventor working for TRW Inc who developed transistor–transistor logic, a form of integrated circuit technology that became widely used early in the integrated circuit industry.

== Biography ==
=== Early life ===
James L. Buie was born in 1920 in Hollywood, California. He went to the local public schools and graduated from Hollywood High School. He then attended the Los Angeles City College and received an associate's degree. Buie served in World War II as a naval aviator and became a lieutenant commander. He was awarded the United States Distinguished Flying Cross for action during May 26–31, 1944.

Buie, an electrical engineering graduate of University of Southern California who received a BSEE in 1950, took his first job at Pacific Semiconductors (PSI) in Culver City, California in 1951, where he worked on transistor circuitry as related to diodes and resistors. He was next employed by Ramo-Woolridge Corporation in 1954; Ramo-Woolridge joined with Thompson Automotive Group in 1958, and eventually in 1965 Thompson-Ramo-Woolridge became known as TRW Inc.

=== Career ===
Buie invented transistor-to-transistor logic circuitry ("TTL") in 1961 at TRW which played a major role in the development of the integrated circuit industry. TTL integrated circuits use transistors for the input gating structure instead of diodes, resistors, and capacitors as was used in the previous technology. His TTL semiconductor technology initially was used in mainframe computers. Buie's integrated circuit chips in the 1970s were the preferred technology for mini-computers, computer peripherals, factory controls, and test instrumentation. The microelectronic processor-based systems he invented were an industrial standard for two decades from the 1980s onwards.

TRW licensed the new technology to other companies to use in data processing and communications electronics. Buie was a senior scientist and one of the organizers for TRW's Microelectronics Center that formed in 1963. The first commercial integrated circuit products using the TTL technology were made by Sylvania in 1963 and known as the Sylvania Universal High-Level Logic family. The TTL electronics Buie invented became the electronics industry standard from the mid-1960s, and the dominant architecture for integrated circuit technology in the 1970s and early 1980s. He helped establish TRW's large scale integration LSI Products Division in 1977.

=== Later life and death ===
Buie was elected a Fellow of the IEEE in 1973. He officially retired from TRW in 1978 as a full-time worker. He then began part-time work as a consultant for the Large Scale Integration division of the company (TRW/LSI Products). Buie then invented other related integrated circuits and patented those "chips", as they were called then. Buie's integrated circuit chip technology was used in various electronics of space satellites and computers into the 1990s. His TTL integrated circuit technology is a fundamental foundation of the electronics industry.

Buie developed emphysema caused by smoking in the 1970s and quit at the time of his retirement. His lungs continued to deteriorate at an accelerated rate that was faster than the natural rate. He was on oxygen assistance from 1985 and continued to consult part-time for TRW. In March 1988 he no longer could physically make the trip to his offices there, and then just did some work on his personal computer at home communicating with TRW by phone. Buie continued to fail in health and died in Panorama City on September 23, 1988, aged 68. He is buried at Fort Rosecrans National Cemetery.
