= Kurt Lehovec =

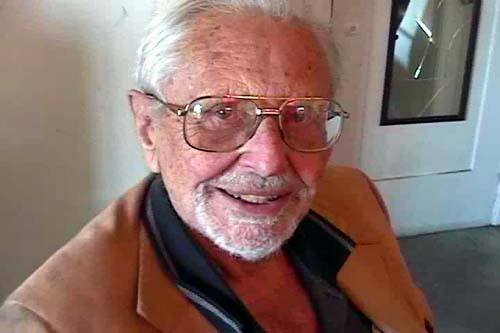
- Born: 12 June 1918; Ledvice, Bohemia, Austria-Hungary
- Died: 17 February 2012 (aged 93); California, United States

Kurt Lehovec (12 June 1918 – 17 February 2012) was a Czech-American physicist. He one of the pioneers of the integrated circuit. While also pioneering the photo-voltaic effect, light-emitting diodes and lithium batteries, he innovated the concept of p-n junction isolation used in every circuit element with a guard ring: a reverse-biased p-n junction surrounding the planar periphery of that element. This patent was assigned to Sprague Electric.

Because Lehovec was under salary with Sprague, he was paid only one dollar for this invention.

Lehovec is also credited with discovering fast ion conductivity, and the invention of colored LEDs.

== Biography ==
Lehovec was born 12 June 1918, in Ledvice in northern Bohemia in Austria-Hungary (now part of the Czech Republic). He was educated there and went to the United States in 1947 under the auspices of Operation Paperclip which allowed scientists and engineers to emigrate. With Carl Accardo and Edward Jamgochian, he explained the first light-emitting diodes citing previous work by Oleg Losev.

The important case of fast ionic conduction in solid states is one in a surface space-charge layer of ionic crystals. Such conduction was first predicted by K. Lehovec in the paper "Space-charge layer and distribution of lattice defects at the surface of ionic crystals" ( J. Chem. Phys. 1953. V.21. P.1123 -1128). As a space-charge layer has nanometer thickness, the effect is directly related to nanoionics (nanoionics-I). The Lehovec effect forms a basis for a creation of multitude nanostructured fast ion conductors as used in modern portable lithium batteries and fuel cells.

Lehovec was a Professor Emeritus at the University of Southern California in Los Angeles, California, and after retirement from USC Lehovec took to writing poetry. He lived in Southern California until his death in 2012 at the age of 93.

== Publications ==
- (unconfirmed)

== See also ==
- Invention of the integrated circuit
