= Carl Frosch =

American scientist (1908–1984)

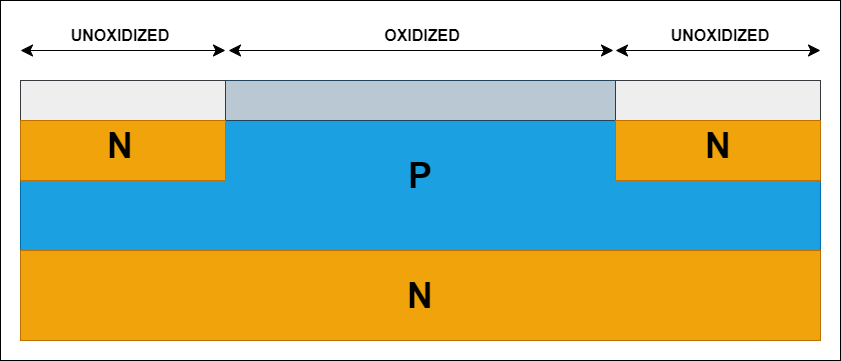
NPN field effect transistor, 1957

Carl John Frosch (September 6, 1908 – May 18, 1984) was a Bell Labs researcher. With Lincoln Derick, Frosch discovered that silicon could be protectively coated by silicon dioxide by the right exposure to oxygen when hot, and patented the method. Such protective coating overcame a problem of surface states found in active silicon circuit elements. The discovery also revealed the potential for the process of silicon etching.

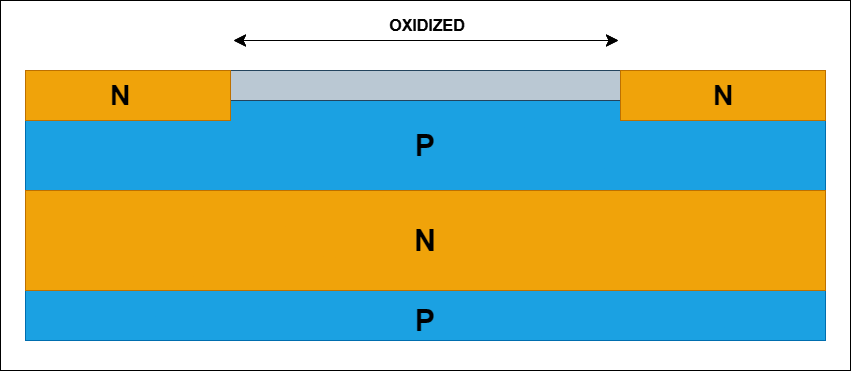
NPNP field effect transistor, 1957

In 1957 Frosch and Derick published their discovery of silicon surface passivation by silicon dioxide, using selective SiO_{2} predeposition and masking to produce the first n-type and p-type semiconductor surface patterns, the first silicon dioxide field effect transistors, the first MOSFET Their transistors were the first in which drain and source were adjacent at the surface, showing that silicon dioxide surface passivation protected and insulated silicon wafers. The invention of the bidimensionar, planar or surface semicondunctor enabled their later mass production.

At Bell Labs, the importance of Frosch's technique was immediately realized. Results of their work circulated around Bell Labs in the form of BTL memos before being published in 1957. At Shockley Semiconductor, William Shockley had circulated the preprint of their article in December 1956 to all his senior staff, including Jean Hoerni. Taking advantage of silicon dioxide's passivating effect on the silicon surface, Hoerni proposed to make transistors that were protected by a layer of silicon dioxide. Later, Jean Hoerni, while working at Fairchild Semiconductor, had first patented the planar process in 1959.

== Transistors devices ==
Frosch and Derrick build several silicon dioxide field effect transistors in 1957. One resembling modern MOSFETs and another with a NPNP structure, similar to modern IGBTs.
