= Strained silicon directly on insulator =

Strained silicon directly on insulator (SSDOI) is a procedure developed by IBM which removes the silicon germanium layer in the strained silicon process leaving the strained silicon directly on the insulator. In contrast, strained silicon on SGOI provides a strained silicon layer on a relaxed silicon germanium layer on an insulator, as developed by MIT.
