= Rockwell PPS-4 =

4-bit microprocessor

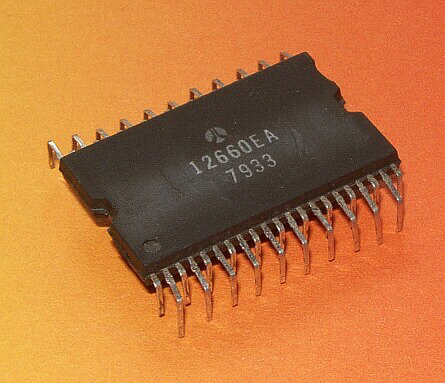
- PPS-4/1 single-chip model

General information
- Launched: 1972; 53 years ago
- Discontinued: 1990s
- Common manufacturer: Rockwell International

Performance
- Max. CPU clock rate: 256 kHz
- Data width: 8 instruction, 4 data
- Address width: 12

Physical specifications
- Package: 42-pin quad in-line package

The Rockwell PPS-4, short for "Parallel Processing System, 4-bit", was an early 4-bit microprocessor from Rockwell International, released in late 1972. Although practically unknown today, the PPS series was widely used in calculators, games and toys, and other embedded applications. Updated versions continued to be produced into the 1980s.

The original version was implemented in a three-chip set, consisting of the CPU, a clock generator, and a user ROM. In 1975, the clock generator was integrated to produce the PPS-4/2 with a variety of ROM and RAM support chips. In 1976, the PPS-4/1 added user-customized ROM to produce a single-chip solution, running at a lower speed.

The release of the PPS-4/1 coincided with the release of the Rockwell PPS-8, a more advanced 8-bit processor. Support chips released for the PPS-8 also worked with the PPS-4/1. These versions of the lineup continued to be produced into the 1980s. The PPS-8, however, was abandoned shortly after its introduction as more advanced 8-bit processors entered the market.

PPS-4 registers
^{1}_{1}	^{1}_{0}	^{0}_{9}	^{0}_{8}	^{0}_{7}	^{0}_{6}	^{0}_{5}	^{0}_{4}	^{0}_{3}	^{0}_{2}	^{0}_{1}	^{0}_{0}	(bit position)
								A				Accumulator
								X				X-register
BU				BM				BL				Mem pointer
P (high)						P (low)						Program Counter
SA												Save Registers
SB
Status flags
							F1		F2		C

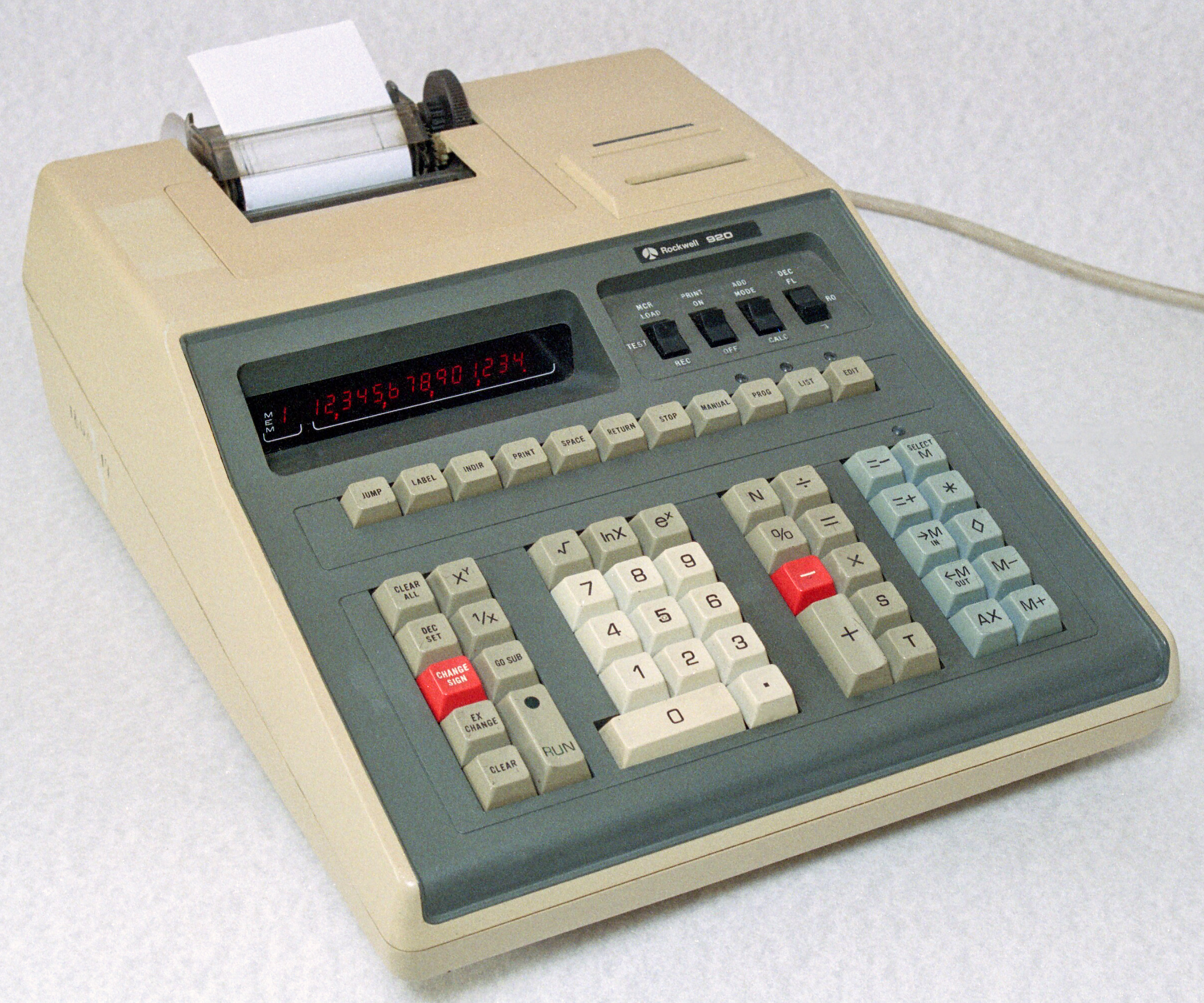
Rockwell 920 programmable electronic calculator, employing the Rockwell PPS-4 4-bit microprocessor

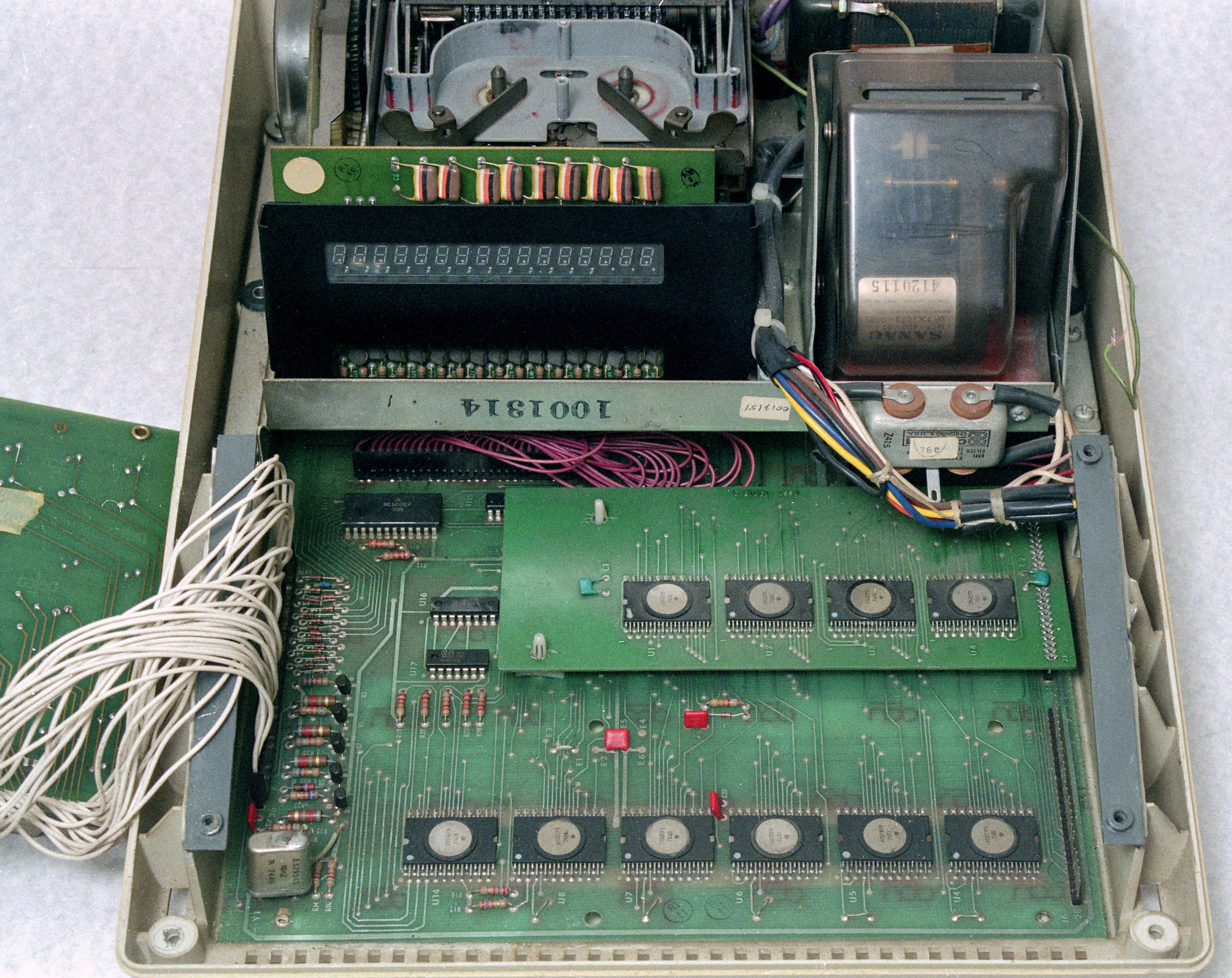
Rockwell 920 electronic calculator interior, showing the Rockwell PPS-4 4-bit microprocessor chip set, 1K byte Read-Only Memory (1024x8-bit, A0577PA, A0578PB, A0579PB, A0580PB, A0581PA), General Purpose I/O (10696PA), Random-Access Memory (256x4-bit, 4x 10432PD, 3x 10432PC), Central Processing Unit (10660PD).

== Description ==
The PPS-4 was built on a metal gate process, compared to the contemporary Intel 4004 which was based on the more advanced silicon gate PMOS logic process. This required high voltages; it ran on a -17 VDC power supply while running at only 256 kHz, whereas the 4004 ran at 750 kHz on a 15 VDC supply.

The CPU, part number 10660, (Note: As noted by the designer Ray Lubow, the name was selected so that when it was fabricated onto the wafer it looked like "lubb0", as close to his name as possible.) was packaged in a 42-pin quad in-line package. The pins included a 12-pin address bus, 8-pin data bus and three 4-pin input/output ports that could be combined in different ways. Power supply and clock signals took up the rest of its 42 pins.

PPS-4's separate data and address buses meant it could read an 8-bit instruction in a single cycle. In contrast, the 16-pin 4004 had a single 4-bit bus multiplexed five ways, meaning specifying a 12-bit address required external latches and three cycles to specify the address and then two cycles to read an instruction. This meant the PPS-4 performed at roughly the same overall speed as the 4004 despite running at a third the clock speed.

A complete system used the 10660 CPU, the 10706 clock generator in a 10-pin TO-5 package, and one of a variety of ROM or RAM chips. The clock was four-phase and based on a standard NTSC crystal due to their widespread availability.

The PPS-4/2 was introduced in the autumn of 1975, combining the clock chip onto the die and reducing the system to two chips, the 11660 CPU and a ROM or RAM. It also had a built-in LED controller. This would normally be used with the Memory/IO System chip, which combined 2 KB of ROM, 128 bytes of RAM, and 16 serial ports that could be combined in various ways.

The PPS-4/1 followed in early 1976, staying with the PMOS process while most other companies had since moved to the new NMOS logic. This was designed to work with the recently released PPS-8, which also used the PMOS process. The two were designed to work with a common set of interface chips. A wide variety of PPS-4/1 models were produced, with different amounts of RAM, ROM and I/O ports build into the die. These versions ran much slower than the original models, between 40 and 120 kHz.
