= PFET =

PFET may refer to:

- p-channel FET (Field-effect transistor)
- PMOS logic
- p-channel MOSFET (metal–oxide–semiconductor field-effect transistor)
