= Jay Miner =

American chip designer (1932–1994)

Jay Glenn Miner
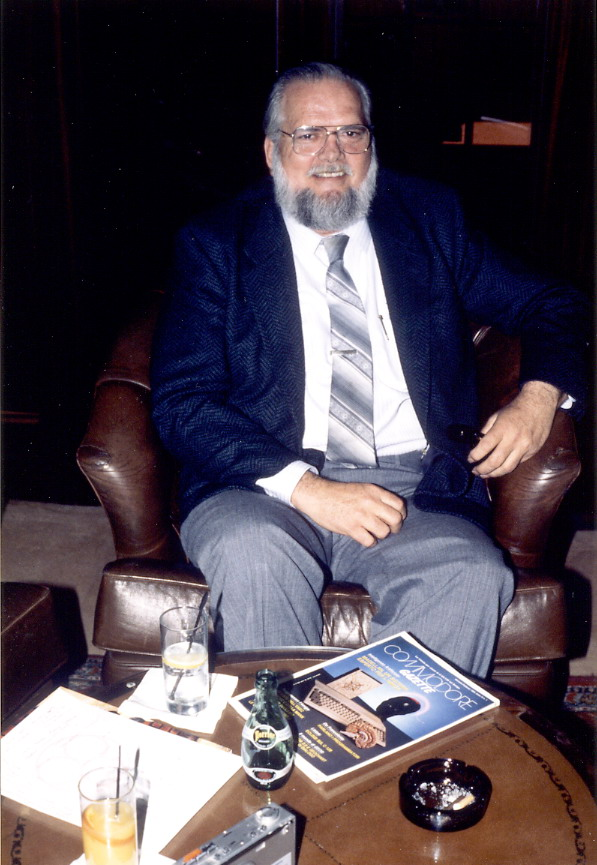
- Jay Miner in 1990
- Born: May 31, 1932; Prescott, Arizona, US
- Died: June 20, 1994 (aged 62); Mountain View, California, US
- Education: UC Berkeley
- Occupation: Integrated circuit designer
- Notable work: Amiga architecture Atari 2600 TIA chip Atari 8-bit graphics chips
- Spouse: Caroline Miner (1952–1994)

Signature
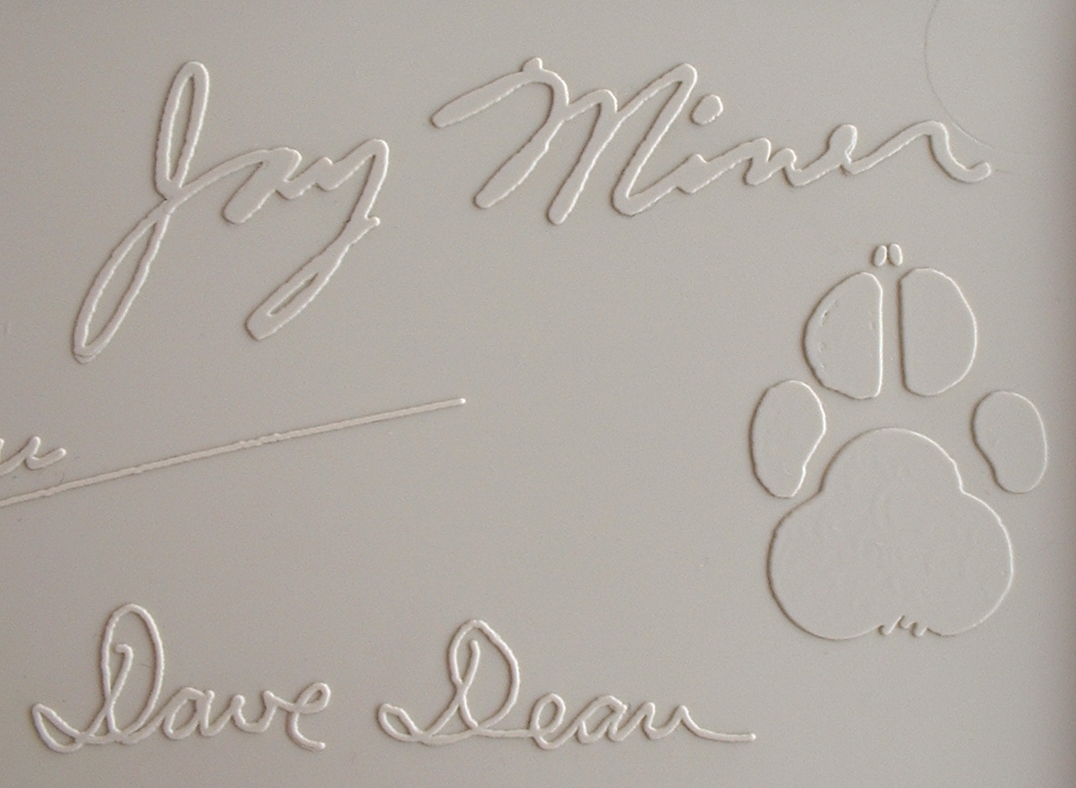

Jay Glenn Miner (May 31, 1932 – June 20, 1994) was an American integrated circuit designer, known primarily for developing graphics and audio chips for the Atari 2600 and Atari 8-bit computers and as the "father of the Amiga".

== Early life ==
Jay Miner received his first formal electronics education after joining the U.S. Coast Guard out of high school. Following his service he became a radio operator for the North Atlantic Weather Patrol who serviced meteorological duties on distant islands for three years. He returned to school to enroll in the University of California at Berkeley, for which he received a BS in EECS in 1958, focusing on electronics design.

== Career ==
Miner first became a chip designer when he joined General Microelectronics in 1964, playing a role in the design of the first calculator to use the MOS ICs, the Victor 3900. He then worked at the companies Standard MicroSystems and American Micro Systems, at the latter of which he contributed to the design of the MP944 microprocessor. Subsequently he co-founded Synertek in 1973, where he served as the company's primary chip designer. One of the company's earliest contracts would be creating CMOS chips for the Bulova Watch Company, but they quickly became a second source manufacturer for chips designed by other firms such as Intel, Rockwell, and MOS Technology.

=== Atari ===
Due to its manufacturing of the MOS Technology 65xx series of chips, Synertek was recommended as a partner to Atari, Inc. after it had been decided to use the MOS 6507 for their upcoming Atari VCS home video game console. One of Atari's engineers, Harold Lee, had worked with Miner at Standard MicroSystems and suggested him as the designer for a custom chip which would power Atari's new console. Through an arrangement with Synertek, Atari hired Miner in late 1975 to lead the chip design for the Atari VCS, primarily that of the display hardware, the TIA.

Miner was also the designer on the follow-up technology intended for a successor console to the Atari VCS. The ANTIC and CTIA were created with enhanced capabilities compared to the TIA but the project was altered from a video game console into what would become the Atari 8-bit computers. Due to clashes with management over this and other decisions, Miner left Atari before the release of the computers and found his way into the medical world. He worked for a company called Zymos Corporation and received two patents for a microprocessor-driven pacemaker made into a product by the company Intermedics Inc. called Cosmos.

=== Amiga ===
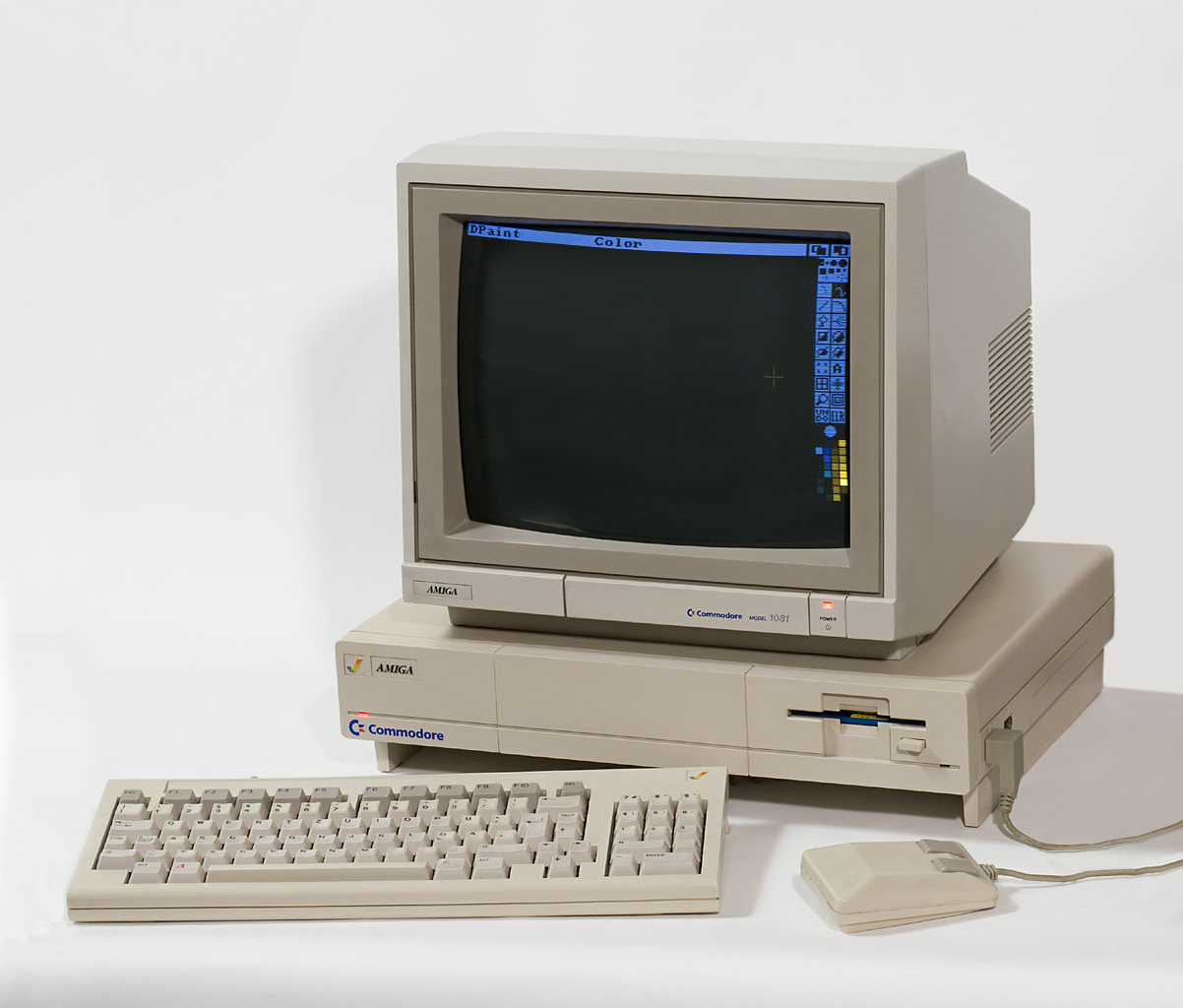
The original Amiga (1985)

In 1979, Miner was approached by David Morse, vice president from Tonka Toys, about starting a new company to create video game hardware without the oversight of a large corporation. Jay Miner agreed to take control of engineering on two conditions: that the design be a computer, and that it be a 16/32-bit system built around the Motorola 68000 CPU. They would become two of the co-founders of the company Hi-Toro. In 1979 the soon-to-be-called Amiga was called the Lorraine. In 1980 with the hardware in hand suddenly became the sole focus of Hi-Toro which was eventually renamed Amiga Corporation. Soon, the company suffered financial difficulties which led it first into a temporary deal with Atari, Inc. and then acquisition by Commodore International.

Miner continued to work for Amiga Corporation as a subsidiary of Commodore. Jay still owned Amiga, because of the patents/IP, but once again grew frustrated with the management style of the company. His frustrations largely revolved around what he said was Commodore marketing executives' failure to penetrate the Amiga into the low-cost computer market. He still owned the majority of Amiga.

Miner's last electronics job was at the company Ventritex, operating medical instrumentation and designing chips which controlled a cardiac defibrillator.

== Personal life ==
Miner married his wife Carolina (née Poplowski) in 1951 while attending an electronics school in Groton, Connecticut. His dog Mitchy, a cockapoo, accompanied him everywhere. While he worked at Atari, Mitchy even had her own employee ID badge with number 000, and an embossing of her paw print is inside the Amiga 1000 top cover, alongside staff signatures.

Miner's personal hobbies included cultivating bonsai trees, square dancing, and camping. He was a particular fan of flight simulators on computers, having been significantly inspired to design Amiga as an excellent flight simulator. He said at one time his favorite Amiga program was the game F/A-18 Interceptor published by Electronic Arts in 1988.

He endured kidney problems for most of his life, according to his wife, and relied on dialysis. His sister, Joyce Beers, donated a kidney to him in 1990. He died due to complications from kidney failure at the age of 62.
