= TrueFoundry =

American software company

TrueFoundry is an American Enterprise PaaS for building, observing, and governing Agentic AI applications.

== History ==
TrueFoundry was founded in 2021 in San Francisco, California, by Anuraag Gutgutia, Abhishek Choudhary, and Nikunj Bajaj. The founders, who had previously worked with technology companies such as Google and Meta, have started this venture to solve issues related to enterprise AI deployment and management.

During its initial stages, TrueFoundry concentrated on MLOps and infrastructure management. Some of its products were those that enabled model monitoring and experimentation tracking. The products of TrueFoundry were designed to make the journey of taking machine learning models from development to production easy.

TrueFoundry announced in February 2025 that the firm had completed a Series A financing round worth $19 million, which was led by Intel Capital with backing from other existing investors such as Peak XV Partners and Eniac Ventures. According to the company, the funding would be used to support product development and business growth.

By 2026, the firm's total funding reached approximately $21.3 million as it continued developing software for organizations using AI applications.

== Technology ==
TrueFoundry develops software for the deployment and management of Artificial intelligence applications. In 2025, AI Gateway was released by TrueFoundry, a solution whose goal is to allow central access and management of multiple AI models and services.

Later in 2025, TrueFoundry launched TrueFailover, a system designed to automatically reroute AI workloads during service disruptions. According to the company, the system can switch workloads between AI providers and geographic regions without manual intervention.
