= DRJ =

DRJ can refer to:

- Drietabbetje Airstrip, an airstrip in Diitabiki, Suriname
- DRJ, a decrement register and jump instruction in Electronic Arrays 9002
- John Vanderaart, a founder of Dutch software company Radarsoft
- German Rugby Youth (German: Deutsche Rugby-Jugend), a suborganization of the German Rugby Federation

== See also ==
- Dr. J, a nickname for American basketball player Julius Erving
