= Victor 3900 =

1965 electronic calculator

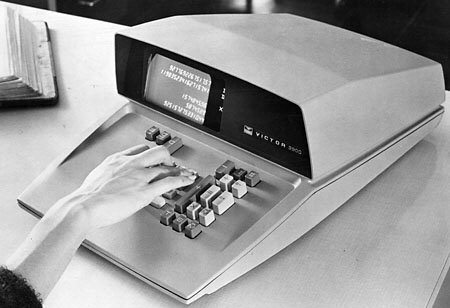
- Promotional photo of a Victor 3900
- Developer: Victor Comptometer
- Manufacturer: General Micro-electronics
- Released: 1967; 59 years ago
- Discontinued: June 1968
- Display: 5-line CRT
- Input: Numerical keypad

The Victor 3900 is the first electronic calculator to have been built entirely of integrated circuits (ICs). For its era, the 3900 is extremely advanced; it has a 4-inch (100 mm) cathode ray tube screen to produce a 5-line display, has separate memory for storing three intermediate results, supports numerical rounding, and is still "smaller than a typewriter".

The original prototype was built by Victor Comptometer using vacuum tubes in 1963. When this was successful, the company sought a semiconductor firm to reduce it to IC form. It contracted with General Micro-electronics (GMe) in 1964 to introduce it to the market in early 1966. It was announced in October 1965 and first demonstrated at the Business Equipment Exposition later that month.

GMe had problems producing the PMOS ICs in quantity, ultimately requiring half of the 29 chips to be redesigned to wider tolerances. Bordering on insolvency, GMe was purchased by Philco-Ford in 1966. Development continued with the first examples shipping in 1967, but continued problems led Victor to cancel the contract. Philco continued offering the device for a short period, but gave up and closed GMe in 1968. By this time, a number of companies had competing products at lower price points.

== History ==
=== Development ===
Victor Comptometer of Chicago had a successful line of mechanical calculators but concluded in the early 1960s that they were destined to be replaced by electronic versions. These had been widely rumored, with specific stories about two such systems being developed in the United Kingdom. To gain familiarity with the basic concepts, in 1962 the company put together a team to build an electronic calculator prototype using vacuum tubes. The machine was complete by late 1963, filling a room.

That year, the tube-based Sumlock ANITA, one of the rumored UK machines, had reached the market. By this point, transistors had begun their wholescale replacement of tubes. Victor was concerned that the delay of redesigning their prototype with transistors instead of tubes would once again allow it to be beaten to market. A new plan emerged for a design that would leapfrog any other system. The integrated circuit (IC), introduced in 1960, appeared to be a way to do this.

=== IC implementation ===
General Micro-electronics (GMe) was formed earlier in 1963 by three members of Fairchild Semiconductor. In June 1964 the company had successfully produced its first metal–oxide–semiconductor (MOS) IC design for the military, and soon branched out to similar products under the Milliwatt Logic product line. In 1964, Howard Bogert built a simple 8-digit calculator using GMe's Milliwatt Logic ICs, and a small article on it was published in Electronic News in March 1964. This caught the attention of Victor, and by October 1964 the two companies had reached a development agreement.

The agreement would have Victor pay GMe US$50,000 (equivalent to $519,045 in 2025) per month during development with the first 25 production units delivered to Victor by April 1965. If the deadline was met, Victor would pay another $500,000 bonus. Victor turned over the design documents on its original tube-based design, and GMe began the task of developing the design so it could be implemented in a series of custom-designed ICs. One key concept of the design was that the initial prototype using Milliwatt Logic ICs would be designed to allow groups of them to be replaced by single larger ICs when future higher-density designs emerged.

Leading development was Bogert. He was aided by Jay Miner, who would later design coprocessors for the Atari Video Computer System, Atari 8-bit computers, and Amiga. A key part of Victor's design is a multi-digit, 5-line display. Had this used the standard solution of the era, Nixie tubes, 105 tubes would have been needed and the price would be too high. Friden, Inc. had recently introduced a transistorized calculator using a small cathode ray tube (CRT) display. Bob Norman purchased a Sony portable television, pulled out the tube, and began adapting it to the calculator role. It turned out the magnetic deflection system it used was not up to the task, and the company instead found a suitable electrostatically deflected system of similar size.

The prototype was running in early 1965 and attention turned to producing the ICs that would replace the printed circuit boards (PCBs) containing dozens of Milliwatt chips. This proved a far higher difficulty and budget than anticipated. The conversion was carried out by converting one PCBs at a time until 23 new ICs were completed and the prototype was up and running in all-IC form. The ICs were much more complex than previous designs, each containing about 300 pMOS transistors, compared to earlier designs with perhaps 12 to 20. The result is that the yield was effectively zero. Significant remedial work was needed before it reached a usable 20 to 30%.

The company worked night and day to produce the 25 models for the April deadline. Victor paid the bonus, but the company had already spent more than that during development. By this time, several other electronic calculators had entered the market, including the Friden 130 and Olivetti Programma 101. The 3900 was more advanced than any of these, especially in accuracy, speed, and display. By mid 1965, the company received considerable interest in the design and set the price at $1,825 (equivalent to $18,645 in 2025).

=== Production and sale ===
The system was formally announced at the Business Equipment Manufacturers Association in October 1965, with deliveries expected in early 1966. Production problems continued, and by the time they reached the market, chip yield was once again a problem. Redesigns followed, with almost half of the 29 ICs having to be redesigned. Additional funds were required to complete the development, and GMe turned to its initial funding source, Pyle National. To GMe's surprise, Pyle responded by selling its stake in GMe to Philco-Ford in December 1965, completed in March 1966.

By this time the initial production examples were in the field and Victor was finding them very difficult to maintain. It returned the unsold examples to Philco and abandoned the product. Philco continued sales as the Philco 3900, which led to some purchases by their parent, Ford Motor Company. In early 1968, Ford managers visited the GMe offices and decided it should be moved to Philco headquarters in Pennsylvania. This led to most of GMe's employees quitting. Philco eventually decided to simply close GMe and the product was abandoned in June 1968.

== Hardware ==
The display is a small cathode ray tube with the individual digits and symbols represented by physical patterns inside the tube. The display in any given location is created by pulling the electron beam over the pattern and then moving it to the correct location on the screen. It is similar in concept to the Charactron. Numbers are stored in a 22-digit binary-coded decimal (BCD) format and displayed on up to five 20-digit rows on the screen.

Internally, the system has a series of PCBs running front-to-back in edge connectors on a backplane. The PCBs are roughly rectangular, but sloping down at the rear to fit within the sloping outer case. Each card holds the equivalent of about 1,500 gates.
