= Electronic Arrays =

American electronics manufacturer

Electronic Arrays, Inc.
- Formerly: McMullen Associates (until 1967)
- Industry: Electronics
- Founded: United States
- Founder: Jim McMullen
- Defunct: 1978
- Fate: Acquired by NEC
- Products: Semiconductors

Electronic Arrays, Inc. was a United States integrated circuit (IC) manufacturer of the 1960s and 1970s. The company originated when Jim McMullen and other employees of General Micro-electronics left to form McMullen Associates, which was later renamed Electronic Arrays, Inc. in 1967.

They were best known for their series of electronic calculator chipsets, starting in 1970 with the EAS100 four-function calculator. Implemented in six chips, rapid improvements in semiconductor fabrication allowed them to progressively combine them in versions with five, four, two and finally a single chip. Although the EAS series was successful for a time, other vendors with more advanced processes entered the market and introduced single-chip systems before Electronic Arrays' own versions. They lost market share to companies like Mostek and Texas Instruments, and later to a slew of Japanese companies entering the market, including Hitachi, NEC, and Toshiba.

The company attempted to change markets with the Electronic Arrays 9002, an 8-bit NMOS logic microprocessor released in 1976. The company struggled with production issues and gave up marketing the design in November 1977. The company was sold to NEC in 1978.
