= Leslie L. Vadász =

Hungarian engineer

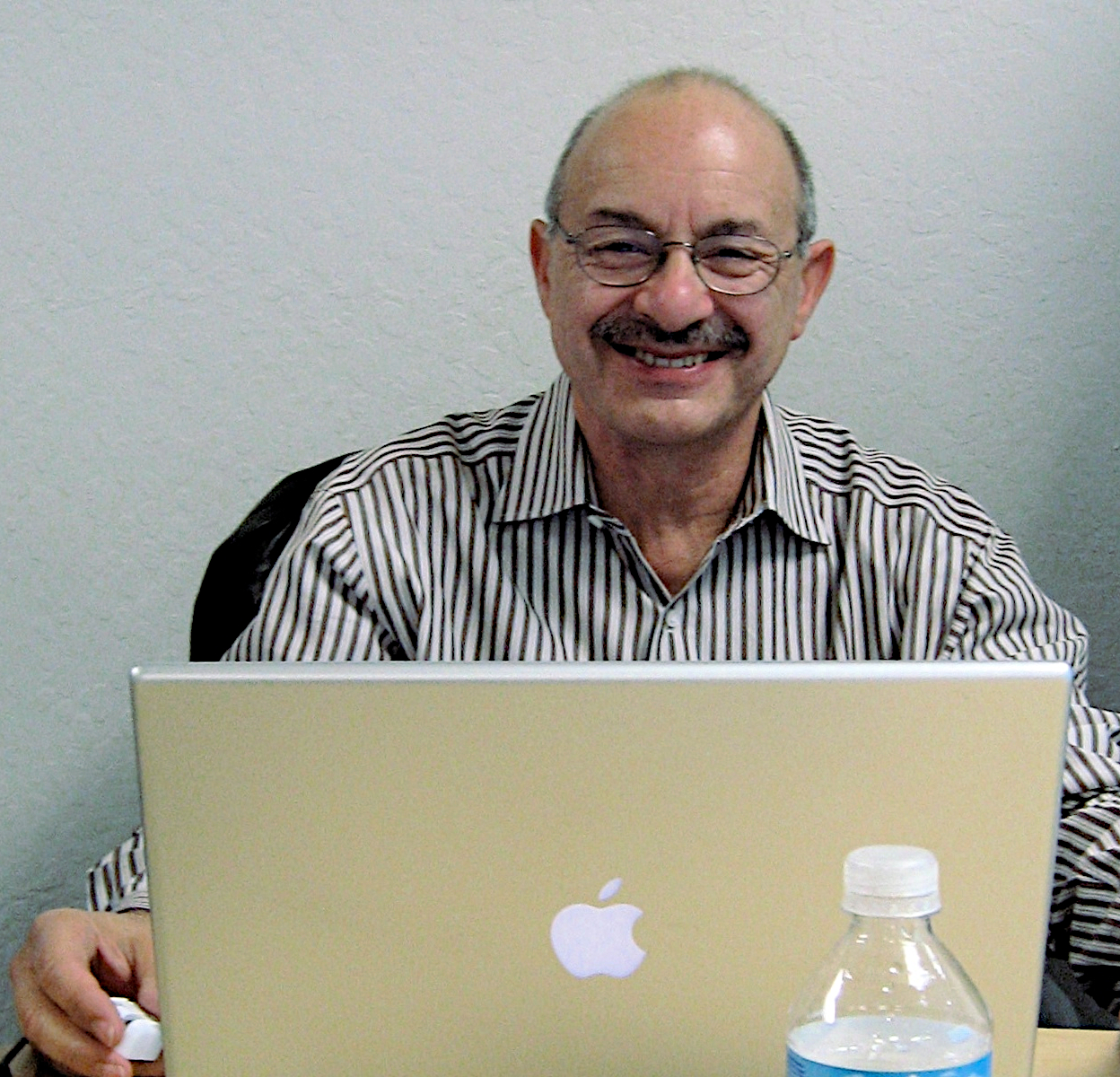
Leslie L. Vadász. Photograph by Steve Jurvetson

Leslie L. Vadász (born Vadász László; born September 12, 1936, in Budapest, Hungary) is a Hungarian-American engineer and manager, one of the founding members of Intel Corporation.

== Early life and education ==
Vadász was born in Budapest to Jewish parents. In 1944, his family was incarcerated in the city's ghetto, where they miraculously survived. In his hometown, Budapest, Vadász developed an early interest in mathematics and literature. After the 1956 Hungarian revolution, he emigrated to Canada. He holds a bachelor's degree in electrical engineering from McGill University in Montreal (1961) and attended the six-week Advanced Management Program (AMP) at Harvard University (1990).

== Career ==
Vadász moved to the United States in 1961 first working at Transitron Corporation (1961–1964, R&D) and then at Fairchild Semiconductor International (1964–1968, R&D) where he helped develop the silicon gate process.

Robert Noyce, and Gordon Moore, his colleagues at Fairchild Semiconductor founded the Intel Corporation in 1968. When the company was founded, Vadász and the also Hungarian Gróf András (Andrew Grove), who took him with him to the new company, they became the company's third and fourth (first non-owner) employees. Vadász, who used to be once the fourth employee of the world-renowned global semiconductor corporation, retired in 2003 as Executive Vice President of the company.

Vadász was the head of the MOS design department where the first microprocessor, the Intel 4004 was developed and led the development of the first highly integrated dynamic RAM and first EPROM chips within the company.

Vadász founded the Intel Capital venture capital firm in 1991, and remained president until he retired in 2003. Since its establishment, the strategic investment firm has paved the way for more than a thousand companies in more than thirty countries around the world. Following his retirement, he remained an Emeritus member of Intel's board of directors.

When announcing Vadász's retirement in 2003, Intel CEO Craig Barrett said: "[Les Vadász] is an engineering engineer who has a great sense of where the industry is headed and where we need to be to succeed. Intel's leadership in the semiconductor industry is largely due to Les Vadász' achievements."
