= 8-bit computing =

Computer architecture bit width

In computer architecture, 8-bit integers or other data units are those that are eight bits wide (one octet). Also, 8-bit central processing unit (CPU) and arithmetic logic unit (ALU) architectures are those that are based on registers of that size or data buses of that width. Memory addresses (and thus address buses) for 8-bit CPUs are generally larger than 8-bit, usually sixteen-bit. 8-bit microcomputers are microcomputers that use 8-bit microprocessors.

The term 8-bit is also applied to the character sets that could be used on computers with 8-bit bytes, the best known being various forms of extended ASCII, including the ISO/IEC 8859 series of national character sets – especially Latin 1 for English and Western European languages.

The IBM System/360 introduced byte-addressable memory with 8-bit bytes, as opposed to bit-addressable or decimal digit-addressable or word-addressable memory, although its general-purpose registers were 32 bits wide, and addresses were contained in the lower 24 bits of those addresses. Different models of System/360 had different internal data path widths; the IBM System/360 Model 30 (1965) implemented the 32-bit System/360 architecture, but had an 8-bit native path width and performed 32-bit arithmetic eight bits at a time.

The first widely adopted 8-bit microprocessor was the Intel 8080, being used in many hobbyist computers of the late 1970s and early 1980s, often running the CP/M operating system; it had 8-bit data words and sixteen-bit addresses. The Zilog Z80 (compatible with the 8080) and the Motorola 6800 were also used in similar computers. The Z80 and the MOS Technology 6502 8-bit CPUs were widely used in home computers and second- and third-generation game consoles of the 1970s and 1980s. Many 8-bit CPUs or microcontrollers are the basis of today's ubiquitous embedded systems.

== Historical context ==
8-bit processors were rare during the minicomputer era. Early minis were usually 12 or 16 bit. Digital Equipment Corporation considered a small 8-bit machine but soon switched to 16-bit. General Automation introduced an 8-bit mini, the SPC-12, in 1968 for very low-end applications.

8-bit microprocessors were the first widely used microprocessors in the computing industry, marking a major shift from mainframes and minicomputers to smaller, more affordable systems. The introduction of 8-bit processors in the 1970s enabled the production of personal computers, leading to the popularization of computing and setting the foundation for the modern computing landscape.

The 1976 Zilog Z80, one of the most popular 8-bit CPUs (though with 4-bit ALU, at least in the original), was discontinued in 2024 (its product line Z84C00), with Last Time Buy (LTB) orders by 14 June 2024.

== Details ==
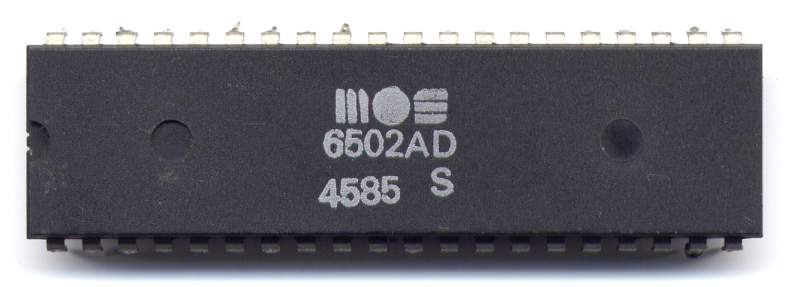
MOS Technology 6502, a popular 8-bit microprocessor introduced in 1975, with a 1985 date code

An 8-bit register can store 2^{8} different values. The range of integer values that can be stored in eight bits depends on the integer representation used. With the two most common representations, the range is 0 through 255 (2^{8} − 1) for representation as an (unsigned) binary number, and −128 (−1 × 2^{7}) through 127 (2^{7} − 1) for representation as two's complement.

8-bit CPUs use an 8-bit data bus and can therefore access eight bits of data in a single machine instruction. The address bus is typically a double octet (sixteen bits) wide, due to practical and economic considerations. This implies a direct address space of 64 KB (65,536 bytes) on most 8-bit processors.

Most home computers from the 8-bit era fully exploited the address space, such as the BBC Micro (Model B) with 32 KB of RAM plus 32 KB of ROM. Others like the very popular Commodore 64 had full 64 KB RAM, plus 20 KB ROM, meaning with sixteen-bit addressing not all of the RAM could be used by default (e.g. from the included BASIC language interpreter in ROM); without exploiting bank switching, which allows for breaking the 64 KB (RAM) limit in some systems. Other computers would have as low as 1 KB (plus 4 KB ROM), such as the Sinclair ZX80 (while the later very popular ZX Spectrum had more memory), or even only 128 bytes of RAM (plus storage from a ROM cartridge), as in an early game console Atari 2600. 8-bit addressing would have been enough for the RAM, if it would not have needed to cover ROM too. The Commodore 128, and other 8-bit systems, meaning still with sixteen-bit addressing, could use more than 64 KB, i.e. 128 KB RAM, also the BBC Master with it expandable to 512 KB of RAM.

While in general 8-bit CPUs have sixteen-bit addressing, in some architectures both are available, such as in the MOS Technology 6502 CPU, where the zero page is used extensively, saving one byte in the instructions accessing that page, and also having sixteen-bit addressing instructions that take two bytes for the address plus one for the opcode.

Some index registers, such as the two in the 6502, are 8-bit. This limits the size of the arrays addressed using indexed addressing instructions to objects of up to 256 bytes (2^{8} bytes) without requiring more complicated code. Other 8-bit CPUs, such as the Motorola 6800 and Intel 8080, have sixteen-bit index registers.

== Notable 8-bit CPUs ==
Two influential lineages of 8-bit microprocessors emerged in the 1970s and became widely used in early personal computers and video game consoles.

The Intel 8008, introduced in 1972, was one of the earliest commercially available 8-bit microprocessors and was originally developed for the Datapoint 2200 intelligent terminal. Its architecture was further developed in 1974 into the Intel 8080, which in turn influenced the Zilog Z80, introduced in 1976.

The other lineage began with the Motorola 6800, introduced in 1974. Its architecture influenced the MOS Technology 6502, introduced in 1975. Its successors included the WDC 65C02, a CMOS version of the 6502 architecture introduced in 1983.

As of 2026, modern derivatives of 8-bit microprocessor architectures continue to be used in embedded systems.

Early or popular 8-bit processors (incomplete)
Manufacturer	Processor	Year	Comment
Intel	8008	1972	Datapoint 2200 compatible
Intel	8080	1974	8008 source compatible
Motorola	6800	1974	
Signetics	2650	1975	
Fairchild	F8	1975	
MOS	6502	1975	Similar to 6800, but incompatible
Microchip	PIC	1975	Harvard architecture microcontroller
Electronic Arrays	EA9002	1976	8-bit data, 12-bit addressing
RCA	1802	1976	
Zilog	Z80	1976	8080 binary compatible
Intel	8048	1976	Intel's first 8-bit microcontroller
Intel	8085	1976	8080 binary compatible
Zilog	Z8	1978	Harvard architecture microcontroller
Motorola	6809	1978	6800 source compatible
Intel	8051	1980	Harvard architecture microcontroller
MOS	6510	1982	Enhanced 6502 custom-made for use in the Commodore 64
Ricoh	2A03	1982	6502 clone minus BCD instructions for the Nintendo Entertainment System
WDC	65C02	1983	6502 binary compatible
Hitachi	6309	1985	6809 emulation mode, faster native mode
Zilog	Z180	1985	Z80 binary compatible
Motorola	68HC11	1985	
Hudson	HuC6280	1987	65C02 binary compatible
Atmel	AVR	1996	
Zilog	eZ80	1999	Backward Z80 binary compatible, 24 bit addressing
Infineon	XC800	2005	
Freescale	68HC08	?	
Motorola	6803	?	
NEC	78K0	?	

== Use for training, prototyping, and general hardware education ==
8-bit processors continue to be designed for general education about computer hardware, as well as for hobbyists' interests. One such CPU was designed and implemented using 7400-series integrated circuits on a breadboard. Designing 8-bit CPUs and their respective assemblers is a common training exercise for engineering students, engineers, and hobbyists. FPGAs are used for this purpose.

== See also ==
- Kenbak-1
