= Intel Capital =

American corporate venture capital firm

Intel Capital Corporation
- Type: Division
- Founded: 1991; 35 years ago
- Headquarters: Santa Clara, California, U.S.
- Area served: United States, China, Western Europe, Israel
- Key people: Leslie L. Vadász
- Products: Venture capital
- Parent: Intel
- Website: www.intelcapital.com

Intel Capital Corporation started off as the investment arm of Intel Corporation in 1991 and in January 2025, it spun off as a standalone investment fund. Intel Capital makes equity investments in a range of technology startups and companies offering hardware, software, and services targeting artificial intelligence, autonomous technology, data center and cloud, 5G, next-generation compute, semiconductor manufacturing and other technologies. The firm has been an active investor in artificial intelligence since 2014. Recent notable investments in artificial intelligence include SambaNova Systems, Figure AI, AI21 Labs, Twelve Labs, Runpod, BRIA, Anyscale, MinIO, Oxide Computer Company, among many others.

== History ==
Established by Les Vadasz in 1991, Intel Capital (originally named Corporate Business Development) was the first corporate venture capital firm. It was first created to support the development of Intel's ecosystem through equity investments in strategic companies. Many of these companies were engaged in the manufacture and development of chips, equipment, and software that fueled the demand for high-end personal computers. Intel Capital now makes investments internationally across North America, Western Europe, Israel, and Asia Pacific.

Intel Capital curates thousands of customer introductions each year between its portfolio companies and the Global 2000, with more than US$20 billion invested over three decades.

In January 2025, Intel announced that it would spin off Intel Capital into a standalone company.

=== Investments ===
Notable exited Intel Capital investments include Red Hat, VMware, MongoDB, ASML Holding, Spot.io, Astera Labs, BabbleLabs, Joby Aviation, CloudGenix, Accurics, Venafi, IMS Nano, iZettle, Moovit, Habana Labs.
