= Electronic Arrays 9002 =

1976 microprocessor

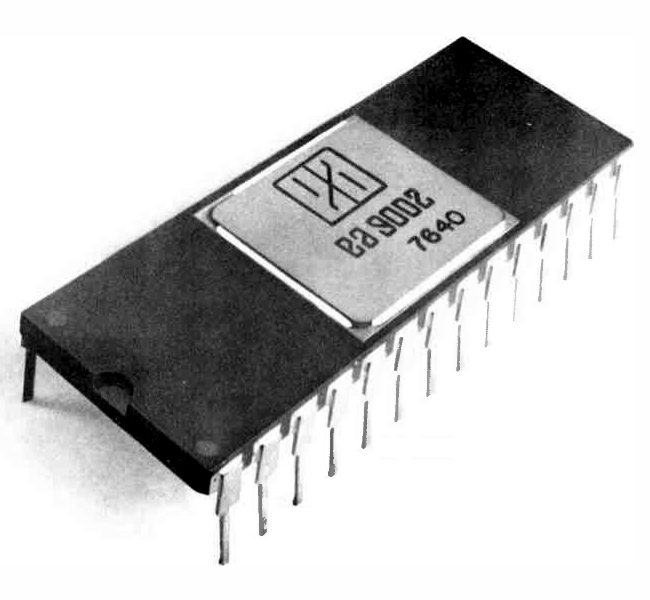

General information
- Launched: 1976; 50 years ago
- Discontinued: 1977
- Common manufacturer: Electronic Arrays

Performance
- Max. CPU clock rate: 4 MHz
- Data width: 8
- Address width: 12

Physical specifications
- Package: 28 pin DIP

Architecture and classification
- Instruction set: Electronic Arrays 9002
- Number of instructions: 55

The Electronic Arrays 9002, or EA9002, was an 8-bit microprocessor released in 1976. It was designed to be easy to implement in systems with few required support chips. It included 64 bytes of built-in RAM and could be directly connected to TTL devices. It was packaged in a 28-pin DIP which made it less expensive to implement than contemporary designs like the 40-pin MOS 6502 and Zilog Z80. Today it would be known as a microcontroller, although that term did not exist at the time. (Note: Although the company did use the term "controller" prominently in its descriptions.)

The 28-pin design did not have enough pins left over to implement a 16-bit address bus, and instead had 12 address lines which limited main memory to 4,096 bytes. This was not a significant limitation at the time, as memory was still very expensive and the target market could often make do with the internal RAM. There was a single 8-bit accumulator used for arithmetic and eight 8-bit registers it could use for storing temporary values. These were supported by another eight 4-bit registers which acted as the most significant bits of the 8-bit registers, extending them to 12-bits for indexing and similar address manipulation.

Electronic Arrays (EA) had problems with the new depletion-load NMOS logic fabrication line and struggled with deliveries. By 1977, the 6502 and Z80 had taken over much of the market, and in November EA stopped selling the design. The company was sold to NEC the next year.

== History ==
Electronic Arrays had their first major success in 1970 with a six-chip electronic calculator chipset, which they had steadily improved over several steps into a single-chip format. However, other companies had continually beat them to market with reduced chip counts, first Mostek and Texas Instruments, and later a number of Japanese electronics firms. By the mid-1970s the company desperately needed a new product line and began development of a CPU.

At the time the 9002 was designed, the microcomputer had not yet emerged as a major market and processors of the era were mostly used in embedded electronics like electronic calculators, cash registers, gas pumps, and similar roles. For these uses, the computer program was normally stored on read-only memory (ROM) and the amount of random-access memory (RAM) needed was very small – keeping track of the number of gallons pumped and the total cost for instance. This led designers to develop systems that included as many of these features as possible on a single chip so that the total number of chips in a complete system was reduced.

In the mid-1970s, dynamic RAM had not yet emerged as the primary form of main memory, and most systems used the much more expensive static RAM. For embedded controllers, this could represent a significant cost, so it was desirable for designers to add a small amount of "scratchpad RAM" to the system to avoid having to add additional RAM chips to the board. As most systems would have little or no external RAM and small programs in ROM, it was also common to use smaller address spaces as this allowed the number of pins to be reduced, which simplified circuit board layout.

Another major change taking place in the mid-1970s was the introduction of depletion-load NMOS logic design. Previous fabrication systems using "enhancement-load" circuits required three input voltages, one of which was typically +12V. This not only made the circuit layout more complex and often required a more complex power supply as well, it also made it more difficult to interface with external support circuits which were mostly based on transistor-transistor logic (TTL) which ran at +5V. Interfacing older chips with the wide variety of TTL components generally required additional latches, but the new depletion-load designs worked at +5V and interfaced directly, reducing cost and complexity.

The 9002 was designed to take advantage of all of these emerging concepts. It included 64 bytes of scratchpad RAM and a 12-bit address space, allowing it to be packaged in a 28-pin dual in-line package (DIP), compared to the 40-pin packaging of most designs of the era like the Zilog Z80 or MOS 6502. It also included a separate seven-level call stack of 12-bit addresses so subroutine calls did not have to use the scratchpad. This allowed a simple controller to be implemented in two chips, the 9002 and a ROM, along with any required interface hardware like an Intel 8212 or even just a flip-flop.

Unfortunately for Electronic Arrays, ramping up the depletion-load fabrication line did not go as well as it did for companies like MOS Technology, and by the end of 1976 they were still struggling with yields. By the next year, chips like the 6502 and Z80 were hitting their production stride and the EA9002 still had no significant design wins. The company eventually gave up and cancelled the line in November 1977. Financially troubled, Electronic Arrays was purchased by NEC the next year and later merged into NEC Electronics USA, along with two other of NEC's subsidiaries, in 1981.

One electronics company, the Pro-Log Corporation of Monterey, California, used the 9002 in a single-board computer in early 1977. In the first edition of An Introduction to Microcomputers, Adam Osborne devoted a chapter to the 9002. He described it as a combination of the Fairchild F8 and RCA COSMAC, in that it had the scratchpad memory and overall concept of the F8 with the multiple general purpose registers of the COSMAC. However, by the time the second edition was published in 1977, the chapters covering the EA9002 and Rockwell PPS-8 were removed as the former had been cancelled and the latter never released.

== Description ==
Electronic Arrays 9002 registers
^{1}_{1}	^{1}_{0}	^{0}_{9}	^{0}_{8}	^{0}_{7}	^{0}_{6}	^{0}_{5}	^{0}_{4}	^{0}_{3}	^{0}_{2}	^{0}_{1}	^{0}_{0}	(bit position)
- Main registers
	AC	Accumulator
GP0	GD0	R0
GP1	GD1	R1
GP2	GD2	R2
GP3	GD3	R3
GP4	GD4	R4
GP5	GD5	R5
GP6	GD6	R6
GP7	GD7	R7
- Program counter
PC	Program Counter
- Subroutine Stack
- S0
- S1
- ...
- S5
- S6
- Status word
	C	D	I	A	H	SP	SW

=== Programming model ===
The 9002 has 55 instructions, patterned on the Intel 4040. Most of these were a one-address format, in which case the instruction opcode was normally split in two, with five bits specifying the operation and the other three a register. For instance, the ADD instruction has an opcode of 0x80 (80 hexadecimal), and the three least significant bits (LSB) specify which of the registers to add to the accumulator, 0 through 7. Likewise the SUB opcode is 0x88, and the three LSBs specify the register.

There are only a small number of two-byte instructions, typically for specifying an address or using an immediate value. For instance, LAI (opcode 0D) loads an immediate value into the accumulator, and is followed by a second byte with the 8-bit immediate value. LRI does the same for the other registers, with the LSBs indicating which register to use. Jumps and branches also use the two-byte format, supplying the address offset within a "page". So does IRJ and DRJ, which increments or decrements a selected register and then jumps if it is non-zero. The second byte specifies the jump location.

Addressing is normally accomplished in two steps, one to load the lower 8-bits of the address into one of the "general purpose" registers, and then a second to load the most significant 4 bits of the address into the "page register". The introductory material uses this example:

LAI 08    ; LAI=load-acc-immediate - copy the page number, 8, into the accumulator
CAP 4     ; CAP=copy-acc-to-page-register - store that 8 in the page part of register 4
LRI 4, 00 ; LRI=load-reg-immediate - load the value 0 into the lower part of register 4

This sets the address in register 4 to the first location in page 8. External memory could then be loaded to or saved from the accumulator using INPut or OUTput and specifying register 4.

Separate instructions are also needed to read and write the internal scratch RAM, which otherwise operated like external memory and had to be loaded and saved through the accumulator using RDS and WRS. One curious feature is that the scratchpad could also be used directly as an operand in addition and subtraction operations, using the ADS and SUS operations, thereby avoiding having to load the value to the accumulator, save it to a register, and then add.

The arithmetic logic unit (ALU) supported both binary and packed binary coded decimal (BCD) arithmetic, as was common for the era. This option was turned on with SED and off with SEB.

=== Execution speed ===
The 9002 normally ran at 4 MHz. It has a 2 microsecond instruction fetch and execution time for single byte instructions and 4 microseconds for two byte instructions. It requires eight clocks per machine cycle.

=== Interrupt ===
The 9002 supports a single interrupt. Interrupts are enabled by executing the ENI interrupt enable instruction which sets the I bit in the status register. Thereafter, if the INT- pin on the 9002 is pulled low, the 9002 will set I to zero, the program counter is pushed on the stack, and the program at location 0x002 is executed.

=== Example code ===
The following assembler source code is for a subroutine named memcpy that copies a block of scratchpad bytes of a given size from one scratchpad location to another. This routine can be modified to copy external memory by substituting INP for RDS and OUT for WRS.

 
 
 
 
 
 
 
 
 
400
400  DO
401  D9
402  70
403  71
404  3A 00
406  FE
407

; memcpy --
; Copy a block of memory from one scratch location to another.
;
; Entry registers
;It is assumed R0 through R7 are equated to 0 through 7
;       R0 - Address of source scratchpad block
;       R1 - Address of destination scratchpad block
;       R2 - Number of bytes to copy (1-256)

         org     0400h        ;Origin at 400h
MEMCPY:  RDS     R0           ;Get byte pointed to by R0 to AC
         WRS     R1           ;store AC to @R1
         INR     R0           ;Bump source pointer
         INR     R1           ;Bump dest pointer
         DRJ     R2, MEMCPY   ;Dec byte counter, Jump if ≠ 0
         RET                  ;Return
         end

=== Support systems ===
As the system was not developed for very long before it was cancelled, few support chips were available. EA did have a line of ROMs and static RAM, and around the same time they introduced a new 32Kx8 (4K byte) ROM which was often illustrated being used with the 9002. The only driver IC they introduced was the EA2000 99-key keyboard controller.

Development was carried out with a macro assembler running on the IBM System/360 which was also available online with National CSS. A system emulator was part of the package, and a simple start-up board was also available. ASM/GEN and SIM/GEN, systems for developing for cross-assemblers and simulators in FORTRAN IV, supported the EA9002 as a target.
