= General Micro-electronics =

U.S. semiconductor company

General Micro-electronics (GMe) was an American semiconductor company in the 1960s. It was formed by three former members of Fairchild Semiconductor, and was thus one of the "Fairchildren". It was acquired in 1966 by Philco-Ford and became their Microelectronics Division.

With Frank Wanlass as director of research and engineering, GMe was the first company to design, fabricate, and sell MOS integrated circuits. The first MOS chips were small-scale integrated chips for NASA satellites. In 1964, Wanlass demonstrated a single-chip 16-bit shift register he designed, with an incredible (for the time) 120 transistors on a single chip.

That same year, the company entered an agreement to convert a Victor Comptometer tube-based electronic calculator to all-IC form, the Victor 3900, with a planned introduction in early 1966. The task proved to be much more difficult than expected, and GMe was left almost insolvent. The company was purchased by Philco-Ford, at which time Victor gave up on the product. They remarketed the system as the Philco 3900, but by the time it was ready for market, a less-expensive alternative had appeared.

Several members of the GMe team would go on to found Electronic Arrays and produce a six-chip calculator system that was successful in the early 1970s.
