= Victor Technology =

American technology company

- Formerly: Victor Adding Machine Company
- Company type: Private
- Industry: Manufacturing
- Founded: 1918; 108 years ago in DuPage County, Illinois
- Founder: Carl Buehler
- Headquarters: Bolingbrook, Illinois, United States
- Website: victortech.com

Victor Technology LLC (also known as Victor Calculator) is a supplier of printing calculators, scientific calculators, financial calculators, basic calculators, and desktop accessories with headquarters in Bolingbrook, Illinois. Victor products are sold primarily throughout the United States, Canada, and Puerto Rico through independent office supply dealers.

== Company history ==
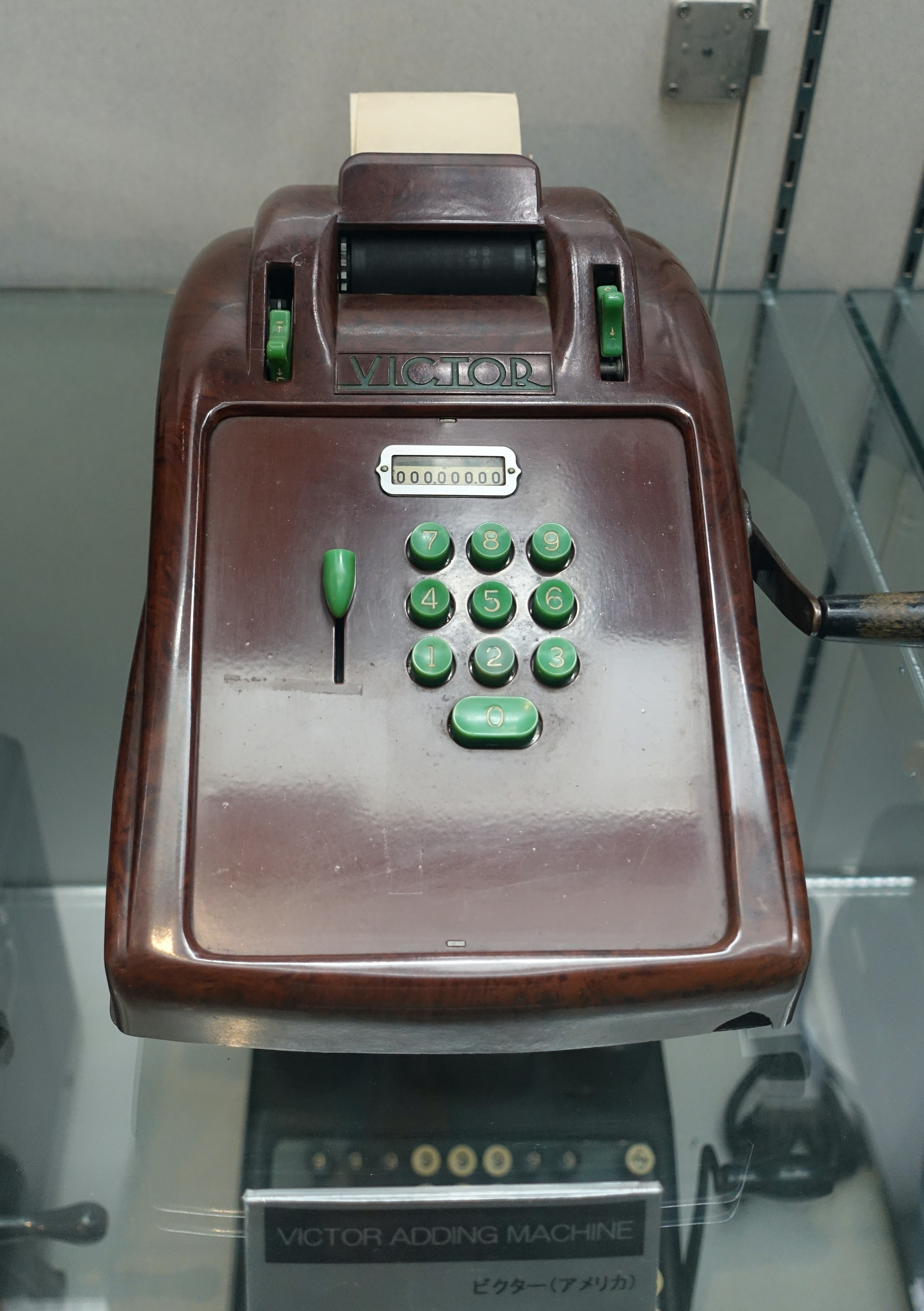
Victor adding machine

Victor Adding Machine Co. was a fledgling company in 1918 when the operator of a chain of meat markets gave a Victor salesman $100, intending to buy an adding machine. Instead, he got 10 shares of the company's issued capital. In an effort to protect his investment, that man – Carl Buehler – became a director of Victor in September 1918 and was elected president of the company three months later. The first Victor adding machine, Model 110, was introduced in 1919.

In 1921, Carl selected his 24-year-old son, A. C., as Vice President of Operations and advised him to operate the company by "working like the devil, but treat the employees right and allow them to make some money." Carl also believed in reinvesting most of the profits so the company could grow. A.C. assumed control of the company on the death of Carl Buehler in 1932.

During World War II, Victor manufactured an aircraft compass, a B-24 bomber turret gunsight, and the Norden bombsight. After the war, Victor had acquired several necessary elements for success in the adding machine industry – quality products, a good research department, an efficient factory, an effective sales organization, and a dedicated service department. By 1947, Victor had become the world's largest exclusive manufacturer of adding machines, and five years later topped the million mark in units sold.

In 1953, Victor went into the cash register business, acquiring its long-time customer, the McCaskey Register Company. This purchase immediately contributed to sales and marked the beginning of a major expansion phase.

A. C. began to evaluate the computer market during the 1950s. He decided that the market had potential, but that he would stay out of it until he could find or develop a product suitable for both large and small businesses. The solution came in 1961 when Victor merged with the Comptometer Corporation, which produced calculating machines and a telecommunication device called the Electrowriter.

In 1965 Victor Comptometer Corporation produced the Victor 3900, a fully electronic calculator with multiple functions, three storage registers, and a small CRT display. The unit incorporated an early MOS integrated circuit for processing and storage. The unit was designed for desktop use, but was extremely large and heavy. Due to manufacturing difficulties, manufacturing was discontinued in 1967.

The newly formed Victor Comptometer maintained an aggressive stance towards product line expansion. In 1966, the cash register line, which had begun with a calculator on top of a cash drawer, was expanded to include the Hugin cash register. This Swedish-made product was distributed by Victor in the U.S. and Canada. By 1967, there were 75 basic models in the Victor line.

After 1967, Victor began designing electronics into Victor products. In 1971, the 1800 series was introduced as the first full line of electronic calculators. In 1973, a revolutionary electronic dot-matrix printer was introduced and sold as an OEM product. In 1974, a series of programmable calculators were introduced and quickly captured a large segment of the banking and small-business market. In 1975, Victor began producing a series of electronic cash registers.

Kidde, Inc. of Saddle Brook, New Jersey, acquired the company and renamed it Victor Business Machines in 1977. Under new ownership, Victor began to search for products for the office of the future. At the top of the list was to find a superior microcomputer product. Toward the end, Kidde made a deal with Chuck Peddle's Sirius Systems Technology, Inc. – a company recognized for manufacturing a technologically advanced, affordable desktop computer designed for the needs of small businesses, Sirius 1. It was an Intel 8088 based machine running MS-DOS and CP/M-86, but more powerful than IBM PC, released at the same time, regarding RAM, display, floppy disk, etc. They realized that the computer would fit perfectly into Victor's well-established network of 50 branches and 680 dealers. An arrangement was made for Victor to have exclusive domestic distribution rights for a three-year period. The computer was sold as the Victor 9000.

The Sirius machine quickly became the number one selling microcomputer in Europe, when IBM waited with the promotion of the PC on that market. Realizing the value of Victor's distribution channels, Sirius set out to acquire the Victor Business Products division from Kidde, Inc. The acquisition was completed in November 1982 and the new company was called Victor Technologies, Inc. Four months later, Victor became a publicly owned company.

The combination of rapid expansion of personnel, a large increase in the number of branch sales offices and sales that did not meet anticipated levels, caused the company to experience financial difficulties in 1983. In order to protect Victor Technologies, Inc. and at the same time find a way to meet its obligations to its creditors, Chapter 11 bankruptcy proceedings began in February 1984. As Victor sought to restructure and streamline its operations in the next year, the company continued to fill orders for both office and computer products.

In August 1984, an agreement was made with Datatronic AB of Sweden to purchase 90% of Victor Technologies, Inc. Datatronic was a diversified corporation with interests that included business microcomputers, software development, finance and consumer products and publications. The purchase was finalized on February 5, 1985. Victor Technologies, Inc. had begun its resurgence as a strong contender in the office products and business computer fields.

Victor redirected its marketing plan to place major emphasis on the calculator business in the United States and the computer business in Europe. During the next few years, both of these divisions grew and became quite successful. During this time period, Victor's parent company, Datatronic AB was sold to Proventus AB, a large Swedish investment company. They, in turn, sold the Victor Computer Division to Tandy Corporation in 1989.

This sale left the successful Victor calculator business intact in the United States. The then current management team of Victor U.S.A. consisting of Dick Battalini, Marty Lent, and Joe Federman formed DMJCO, Inc., which then purchased the assets of Victor Technologies, Inc. in May 1991. Both Battalini and Lent had at that time over 25 years of experience with Victor in Sales and Marketing, and Federman, the then-President of Victor Technologies, Inc., had many years of experience in both public and corporate finance and corporate management.

In 2006 the assets of DMJCO, Inc. were acquired by the existing management team of Jordan Feiger and John Ringlein and the company's name became Victor Technology LLC.

In 2007 Victor Technology released the V12 financial calculator which competed with the long-established Hewlett Packard HP-12C financial calculator.

In 2008 Victor launched the PL8000 printing calculator. The PL8000 contained many industry firsts including an alphanumeric display, alphanumeric printer, Prompt Logic guides for the user, Loan Wizard, personalized text messages, reprint key, and HELP key. The PL8000 was also the fastest and quietest printing calculator available at that time.

In 2012, Victor launched the Midnight Black Collection of high-end desk accessories.The collection has since expanded to include Pure White, Classic Silver, Mocha Brown, and Heritage Wood color variations.

In 2015, Victor became the source for Sharp calculators in the United States and Latin America.
