= Harry Dornbrand =

American aerospace engineer (1922–2022)

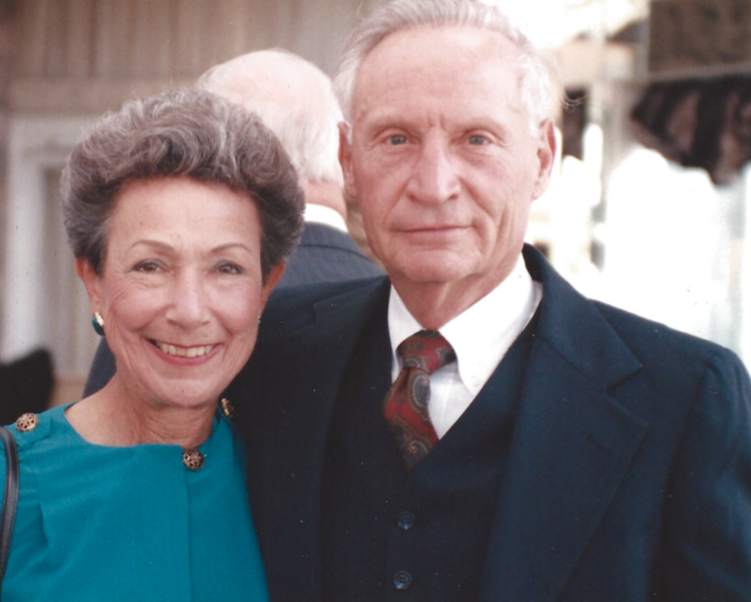
- Harry Dornbrand and his wife Mildred
- Born: November 10, 1922; Brooklyn, New York, U.S.
- Died: May 8, 2022 (aged 99); Rockville, Maryland, U.S.
- Occupation: Aerospace Engineer
- Spouse: Mildred F. Bernstein (? - his death)
- Children: 3
- Awards: NASA Distinguished Public Service Medal

Harry Dornbrand (November 10, 1922 – May 8, 2022) was an American aerospace engineer, and a leading figure in the development of satellite technologies during the early space race era. He served as Vice President, then President of Fairchild Industries Space and Electronics division, Vice President of Fairchild Industries (the parent corporation), and President of American Satellite Corporation, a Fairchild subsidiary. The technologies and projects he developed and managed for Fairchild and NASA in the 1960s and 1970s were critical for the advancement of satellite technology worldwide and pioneered new applications like geosynchronous satellite television broadcasting and orbital scientific experimentation. He was a member of the American Institute of Aeronautics and Astronautics. In 1974 he was awarded the NASA Distinguished Public Service Medal for his success managing the ATS-6 satellite program.

== Early life ==
Harry was born in Brooklyn on November 10, 1922, to a family of Jewish European immigrants. His father Morris, age 9, arrived on Ellis Island in 1899 from Rohatyn, in what was then Austria. Like his father Mechal, Morris worked as a seasonal sweatshop machine operator, sewing pockets on vests in Lower Manhattan during the era of the Triangle Shirtwaist Factory fire. Harry enrolled at City College as a student of engineering, and graduated in 1944 with a Bachelor of Science in Mechanical Engineering. During his time at City College he ran a campus network for delivery of The New York Times.

After graduating he enrolled in the United States Navy and was sent to the Moffett Field Naval Air Station to do research for NASA's predecessor, the National Advisory Committee for Aeronautics. He published two technical research papers (listed here). While working his first civilian job after World War II, Dornbrand earned a master's degree in thermodynamics from Columbia University in 1953. He married Mildred F. Bernstein, a graduate of Brooklyn College with a degree in Biology, and they had three children, Phyllis, Faith, and Carol Lynn.

== Career ==
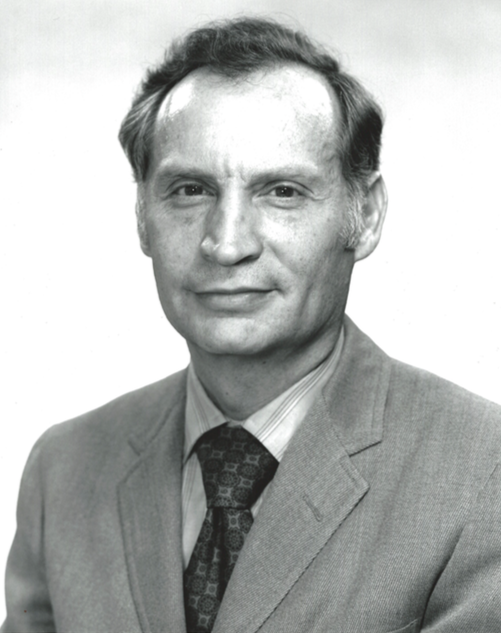
Photo taken of Harry Dornbrand during his time at Fairchild Space and Electronics.

During his time in the United States Navy, Dornbrand specialized in heat transfer, thermodynamics, and fluid flow research with NACA, at the Ames Aeronautical Laboratory. In 1946 he began work at Republic Aviation in Long Island, New York, where he was manager of space systems technology. During his 20 years there he held management positions on the FIRE system, Advanced Orbiting Solar Observatory, Synchronous Meteorological Satellite and Manned Orbital Laboratory programs. Republic was purchased by Fairchild Hiller in 1965 and Dornbrand moved to Fairchild's Germantown, Maryland facility.

=== Fairchild and American Satellite Corporation ===
In 1966, Dornbrand joined Fairchild Industries Space and Electronics and worked as a Project Manager until 1973, when then-President Wilbur Pritchard elevated him to the rank of Vice President. During his time at Fairchild he facilitated the design and launch of multiple aerospace projects, the most notable of which were satellites in the Applications Technology Satellite series commissioned by NASA. Following the success of the ATS-6, Dornbrand became President of Fairchild Space and Electronics in 1975. In 1976 he was appointed President of American Satellite Corporation, a subsidiary company of Fairchild.

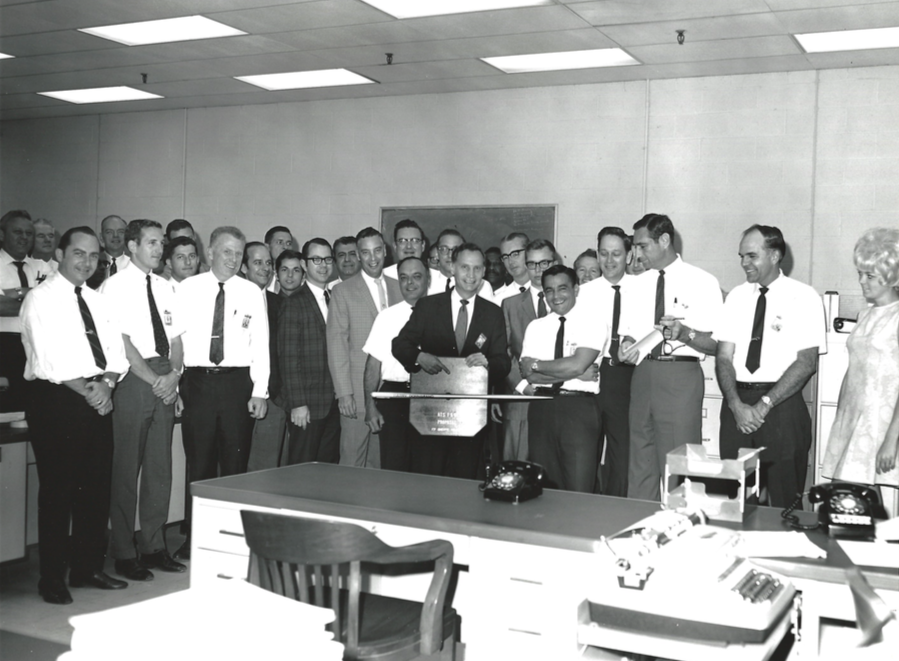
Harry Dornbrand receiving an unofficial award from colleagues at Fairchild Space and Electronics division after the team met the deadline for delivering the proposal for the ATS-6 satellite to NASA, in 1969.

While Dornbrand was a Program Manager and Assistant General Manager of Fairchild Space and Electronics Division, NASA contracted Fairchild to oversee the creation of the ATS-6 and ATS-7 (also known as ATS-F and ATS-G) satellites, and he was appointed to be manager of both projects. The ATS-6 satellite was the most powerful telecommunications satellite of its time, the first Direct Broadcast Satellite, the first educational satellite, and the first 3-axis stabilized spacecraft in geostationary orbit, among other accolades. It received high praise from NASA, and in 1975, Dornbrand along with other chief Fairchild representatives including Wernher von Braun demonstrated its ability to aim broadcast signals at any part of the United States, a technological breakthrough at the time.

NASA originally commissioned a seventh satellite in the ATS series, but despite the construction of an ATS-G prototype, the project was never completed. In a 1976 article of the Fairchild World journal, Dornbrand said that due to the success of ATS-6 and "because the ATS-6 satellite gives promise of lasting for many more years than originally expected, NASA cancelled the second spacecraft". ATS-G (the second satellite) sat for some years in a Fairchild lot, and was later donated to the Smithsonian National Air and Space Museum.

== Personal life ==
Dornbrand died in Rockville, Maryland, on May 8, 2022, at the age of 99. He is survived by his wife Mildred, three children, four grandchildren and four great-grandchildren.

== Publications ==
- Technical specifications for the ATS-6 satellite written by Harry Dornbrand. NASA Technical Reports.
- Infrared Defrosting and Deicing, 1952. Worldcat.
- Theoretical and Experimental Study of Vortex Tubes, 1950. Worldcat.

== Awards ==
For his work with NASA leading the ATS-6 project, Dornbrand received the NASA Distinguished Public Service Medal, the highest honor awarded to a non-government employee by that organization.

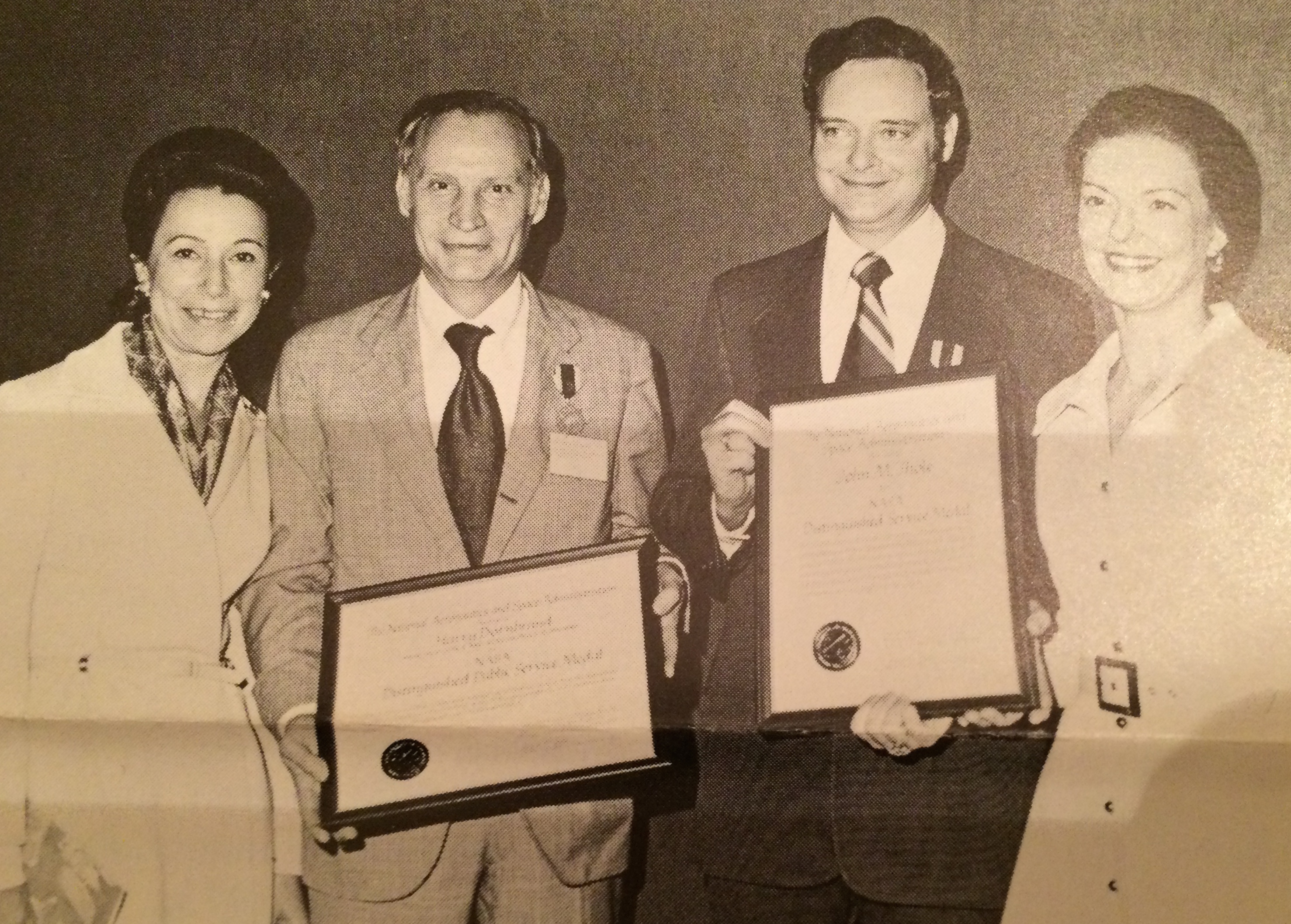
Harry Dornbrand (second left) and John Thole (second right) receive the NASA Distinguished Public Service Medal and NASA Distinguished Service Medal (respectively) for their work managing the ATS-6 satellite.

== See also ==
- Fairchild Industries
- ATS-6
