= Capitol Studios =

Recording studio in Hollywood, California, US

Coordinates: 34.1031°N 118.3262°W

- Type: Recording studio
- Industry: Music
- Founded: 1956; 70 years ago
- Area served: Los Angeles, California, United States
- Parent: Capitol Music Group
- Website: capitolstudios.com

Capitol Studios is a recording studio located at the landmark Capitol Records Building in Hollywood, California, United States. The studios, which opened in 1956, were initially the primary recording studios for the American record label Capitol Records. While they are still regularly used by Capitol recording artists, the facilities began to be made available to artists outside the label during the late 1960s to the early 1970s. The studios are owned by Universal Music Group, the parent company of Capitol Music Group.

Since Capitol Studios' founding, the studio has hosted many well-known artists such as: Frank Sinatra, Nat King Cole, Michael Jackson, Dean Martin, Barbra Streisand, Paul McCartney, The Beach Boys,The Kingston Trio, John Mayer, Green Day, Billie Eilish, and Daft Punk. Along with traditional recording sessions, the studio has been the location of numerous events that include iTunes, Sirius/XM sessions, CMG Productions, such as the Top of the Tower concerts and the 1 Mic 1 Take Series. They've also hosted music video shoots including Justin Timberlake's "Suit & Tie", TV/documentaries Behind the Music, Classic Albums, Showtime Original Lost Songs: The Basement Tapes Continued, the HBO feature If You're Not In The Obit, Eat Breakfast, PBS specials, and many other projects. The Studio has hosted the Oscars for the past two decades and hosts dozens of branded experiential and playback events each year.

== Facilities ==
=== Overview ===
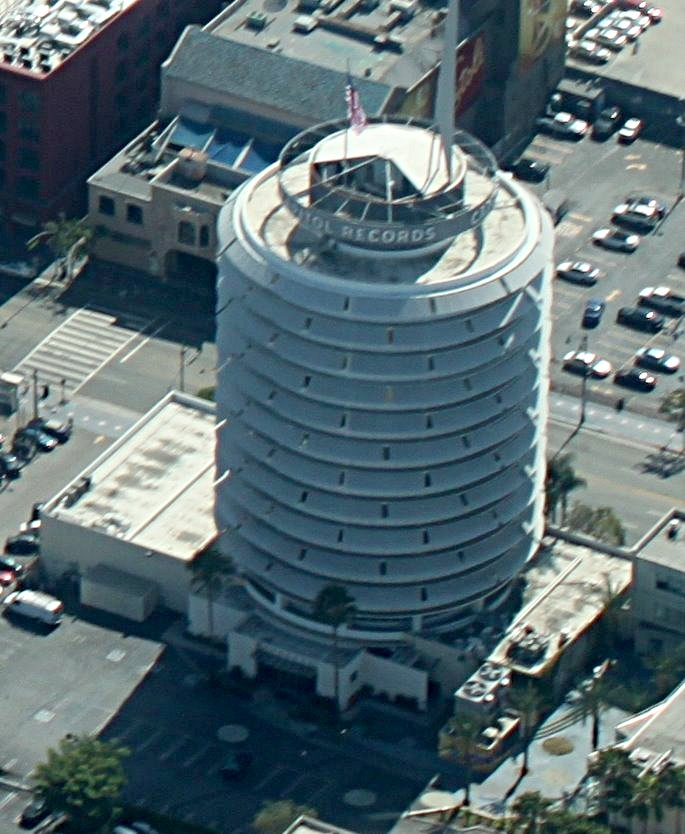
An aerial view of the Capitol Records Building

Founded in 1942 as the first West Coast-based record label of note in the United States by Johnny Mercer, Buddy DeSylva, and Glenn E. Wallichs, Capitol was acquired by British music conglomerate EMI as its North American subsidiary in 1955. Construction of the Capitol Studios Building began soon after. Designed by Louis Naidorf of Welton Becket Associates, it stands as one of Los Angeles' major architectural landmarks, an emblem of mid-century Novelty Architecture. The building was completed in April 1956.

Capitol Studios are located in the rectangular ground floor base of the 13-story circular Capitol Records Tower, just north of the intersection of Hollywood and Vine. The Capitol Studios facility has business offices, five mastering rooms and four studios, three of which were constructed within a layer of asphalt-impregnated cork to insulate them from outside vibration. Originally designed by acoustics expert Michael Rettinger and Capitol's chief electronics engineer, Edward Uecke, with objectives to accommodate developing musical and recording trends like high-fidelity and stereo recording, the studios have been remodeled and updated to meet evolving demands.

In 2006, EMI Music North America sold the Capitol Records Tower to New York real estate firm Argent Ventures, but agreed to keep Capitol Studios in the Capitol Tower under long-term lease.

=== The Studios ===
Studio A is the largest single recording space, with 1,500 square feet of floor space capable of accommodating up to 50 musicians at one time. The studio features adjustable wooden wall panels for adjusting the room's reverberation delay time, as well as two isolation booths, and has been utilized by artists ranging from Frank Sinatra and Nat King Cole to Imagine Dragons, Cheryl Ladd and Michael Bublé. A large private artist lounge is located above the control room, which features a 72-input Neve 88RS analog mixing console and PMC QB1-A monitor speakers.

Originally built in 1956, Studio A was remodeled by Jeff Cooper in 1989. In 1990, a retractable soundproof wall was installed between Studio A and Studio B, enabling them to be joined together to create an over-2700 square foot space large enough to accommodate up to 75 musicians for the recording of orchestral and soundtrack music. Clients have access to instruments that have been played on numerous Capitol Studios sessions, including Yamaha C9 and New York Steinway Model B grand pianos, vintage Rhodes and Wurlitzer keyboards, and a Hammond B-3 Organ. The studio's outboard equipment includes a selection of vintage and modern equipment, including Fairchild 670 and UREI 1176 vintage compressors.

Studio B contains 1023 square feet of floor space and a 150 square foot drum booth. While this makes Studio B ideal as a rock studio, it is also sonically responsive enough to handle orchestral sessions. The studio has the original 1956 adjustable swing-out acoustical panels with varnished hard wood surface on one side and absorptive fiberglass on the other side, as well as separate moveable soundproof partitions along the back wall for sound separation when recording live ensembles. The control room is outfitted with a vintage Neve 8068 56-input recording console that has been autographed by famous engineers and producers, including Rupert Neve, George Martin, Eddie Kramer, Geoff Emerick, Phil Ramone, Al Schmitt, and Andy Johns. Designed by Jack Edwards, Studio B has been the location of sessions for artists such as Green Day, Bob Dylan, Neil Young and John Mayer. Like Studio A, Studio B has PMC QB1-A monitor speakers and a large private artist lounge that overlooks the studio.

Studio C is a 440 square foot mixing suite with overdub capabilities and its own isolation booth. Remodeled by Vincent Van Haaff, Studio C was Al Schmitt's favorite mixing room, and has been the site of multiple Grammy-winning mixes over the years. Studio C's Neve 88R 72-input console with full surround monitoring scoring capabilities, including Dolby Atmos, Auro-3D, 7.1 and 5.1, making it ideal for TV and film projects. Across The Universe, True Lies, The Revenant, Independence Day: Resurgence and Chips were mixed in Capitol Studio C.

Studio D is a 259 square foot mixing and editing suite with adjacent isolation booth for the recording of vocals and overdubs. Studio D is outfitted with a vintage Neve 8058 console.

All of Capitol's studios have full access to Capitol's echo chambers.

=== Echo chambers ===
One of Capitol Studios' assets are its eight subterranean echo chambers. Located 30 feet below Capitol Tower's parking lot, each of the trapezoidal-shaped echo chambers, constructed with thick concrete walls and ceilings finished with a highly reflective hard lacquer, was designed to have a different sound. The echo chambers are capable of producing a maximum reverb time of 5 seconds. Sound from any of Capitol's studios or mastering rooms can be sent to speakers in the echo chambers, with microphones capturing the combination of the sound, along with the rich reverberation of the chamber, and returning it to the studio. Chambers 1-4, designed by Les Paul, were completed as part of the building's original construction in 1956, with chambers 5-8 added in 1969. Capitol previously leased their echo chambers to studios like United Western Recorders and The Village, who recorded using the chambers remotely via telephone lines. In 2019, Universal Audio released officially licensed software emulations of Capitol Studios' four most popular echo chambers.

=== Mastering ===
Capitol Studios also features an on-site mastering department with five dedicated mastering rooms. Capitol's mastering team also has access to Capitol Studio's echo chambers, analog tape machines and digital technology, as well as proprietary custom-built gear, made in-house by Capitol's technical and engineering staff. Artists like the Beach Boys, R.E.M., Deep Purple, Glass Animals, N.W.A., Red Hot Chili Peppers, Miley Cyrus, and Selena Gomez have all had projects mastered at Capitol Studios.

Capitol Studios has two vintage Neumann recording lathes used to cut lacquer for vinyl in all formats including 7", 10" and 12". These vintage lathes have been used to cut such notable albums as Pink Floyd's The Dark Side of the Moon, the Bee Gees' Saturday Night Fever, Paul McCartney's Band on the Run, George Harrison's All Things Must Pass, John Lennon's Plastic Ono Band, Ringo Starr's album Ringo 2012, and Boston's debut studio album Boston.

== History ==
=== 1956 through 1969 ===
Capitol Studios opened in 1956. The first recording session in the new studio was the Frank Sinatra and Gordon Jenkins collaboration Frank Sinatra Conducts Tone Poems of Color. Frank Sinatra recorded regularly at Capitol Studios through the end of the 1950s. Nat King Cole, whose commercial success with Capitol earned the Capitol Tower the nickname "the house that Nat built," recorded at Capitol Studios up until his death in 1965. Other notable artists who recorded at the Studios in the 1950s included Dean Martin, Billie Holiday, Ella Fitzgerald, Louis Armstrong, and The Kingston Trio.

The Kingston Trio continued recording at Capitol Studios in the 1960s, and the Beach Boys recorded portions of their 1963 album Surfin' U.S.A. at Capitol. The studios also produced commercially successful albums from country music artists like Glen Campbell, and the Bakersfield sound of Buck Owens and Wynn Stewart. Other notable artists who recorded at Capitol Studios in the 1960s included Nancy Wilson, Stan Kenton, George Shearing, Plas Johnson, Cannonball Adderley, Bobby Darin, Peggy Lee, Wayne Newton, Lou Rawls, The Seekers, Linda Ronstadt and The Stone Poneys, Frank Zappa and The Mothers of Invention, and Billy Preston. In 1968, Capitol Studios' services, previously reserved for Capitol Records artists exclusively, were made available to the general public.

=== 1970 through 1989 ===
In the 1970s, Capitol Studios recorded the Steve Miller Band album The Joker and George Benson's Grammy Award-winning Breezin'. Brad Delp recorded the vocals for Boston's eponymous debut album in Capitol Studio C. Other notable artists who recorded at Capitol Studios in the 1970s included Merle Haggard, Bobbie Gentry, Helen Reddy, Heart, Barbra Streisand, and Bob Marley and the Wailers.

In the 1980s, Capitol Studios is where Miles Davis recorded parts of his Grammy-award winning album, Tutu, and where Bob Seger recorded his commercially successful album, Like a Rock. Dwight Yoakam recorded his first three albums at Capitol Studios; all three topped the U.S. Country album chart. Other notable artists who recorded at Capitol Studios in the 1980s included The Carpenters, David Lee Roth, America, Michelle Shocked, Barry Manilow, Circle Jerks, and The Smithereens.

=== 1990 through 2009 ===
In 1990, a retractable soundproof wall was installed between Studio A and Studio B, enabling them to be joined together to create an over-2700 square foot space large enough to accommodate up to 75 musicians for the recording of orchestral and soundtrack music. The same year, Alice In Chains' recorded Facelift at the studios. Other albums recorded at Capitol Studios in the 1990s included Steve Lukather's Candyman, Willie Nelson's Healing Hands of Time, Toto's Tambu, and Dee Dee Bridgewater's Dear Ella. Other artists recording at the studios in the 1990s included Bonnie Raitt, Frank Sinatra, Harry Connick Jr., Celine Dion, Natalie Cole, Tanya Tucker, Richard Marx, and Dave Koz.

In 2000, Al Jarreau recorded his album Accentuate the Positive at Capitol. The subsequent decade would mark repeated success for Diana Krall projects recorded at the studio, including the Grammy Award winning album The Look of Love. Garry Schyman also recorded the BioShock 2 soundtrack at the studio. Other artists recording at Capitol in the 2000s included Sting, Ringo Starr, Green Day, Coldplay, Train, Britney Spears, Faith Hill, Mariah Carey, The Wallflowers, Weezer, Oasis (band), Robbie Williams, and Toni Braxton.

=== 2010 to present ===
In 2010, Paul McCartney recorded most of his 2012 album, Kisses on the Bottom, at Capitol Studios. In 2012, Studio A's control room was updated with a Neve 88RS recording console, and the first project to utilize the new console was McCartney's iTunes Live from Capitol Studios. The same year, Capitol launched the 1 Mic 1 Take series of stripped-down live performances produced exclusively at Capitol Studios. Other albums recorded at the studios in the 2010s included Bob Dylan's Shadows in the Night and Fallen Angels, John Mayer's The Search for Everything, and Jenny Lewis' On the Line. Other artists recording at Capitol in the 2010s included Tony Bennett, Imagine Dragons, Tori Kelly, Sam Smith, Muse, Mary J. Blige, Beck, Ryan Adams, Michael Buble, Seth MacFarlane, Queen Latifah, Emeli Sande, T Bone Burnett, Elvis Costello, Daft Punk, Sum 41, Toto, Ozzy Osbourne, and Shinedown.

In 2016, Capitol Studios celebrated its 60th anniversary.

On April 30, 2022, Paul McCartney and Giles Martin oversaw the recording of string overdubs for "Now and Then", the final Beatles song ever to be released, at Capitol Studios.

== Other Capitol Studios locations ==
=== 5515 Melrose Avenue, Hollywood ===
Prior to establishing its own West Coast recording studio in 1948, Capitol Records booked recording sessions for their artists at Radio Recorders or C.P. MacGregor Studios. In Fall 1948, Capitol purchased the former home of radio station KHJ at 5515 Melrose Avenue to establish Capitol Studios. Capitol Studios operated in the Melrose Avenue location from 1948 until 1956, and was one of the first recording studios to offer multitrack recording to tape via Ampex Model 200 tape decks. Notable Capitol Records classics, including Nat King Cole's "Mona Lisa" and "Unforgettable," Frank Sinatra's "I've Got the World on a String" and "I've Got You Under My Skin" were recorded at Capitol Studios on Melrose Avenue.

=== 151 West 46th Street, New York ===
From 1949 to 1961, Capitol owned and operated Studio A in New York City's Theater District, Midtown Manhattan, in the Eaves Building on the piano nobile, the first floor, one up from the ground floor. During that time, the Eaves Costume Company occupied the ground floor. Artists that recorded there include Nat King Cole, Duke Ellington, Ray Charles, and Count Basie. The Eaves Costume Company – still in existence, founded by Albert Grammer Eaves (1847–1900) in 1863 (163 years ago) – built the building and opened it May 1, 1928.

== See also ==
- Capitol Records
