= American Satellite Corporation =

American satellite services company

American Satellite Company
- Company type: Partnership with Continental Telephone
- Industry: Satellite
- Founded: 1972
- Products: Satellite television
- Parent: Fairchild Industries

American Satellite Company (ASC) was one of many Fairchild Industries subsidiary companies and was established in partnership with Continental Telephone in 1972. Emanuel Fthenakis was the President and Chief Executive Officer upon the founding of the corporation. He was replaced in 1976 by Harry Dornbrand, who was President of Fairchild Space and Electronics division at the time. Under their leadership, ASC pioneered advancements in satellite broadcasting both domestically and abroad.

== Overview ==
In June 1973 ASC became the first company to transmit United States domestic television via satellite. The first broadcast was of an address by then Speaker of the House Carl Albert delivered in Washington, D.C., and sent to the National Cable Television Association convention in Anaheim, California.

On the same day, they became the first company to broadcast a major sports event via satellite: the fight between Jimmy Ellis and Ernie Shavers in Madison Square Garden.

ASC was headquartered in Rockville, Maryland, and had 4 Earth stations located in SFES - San Francisco, CA (Benicia), LAES - Los Angeles, CA (Nuevo), DAES – Dallas, TX, NYES – New York, NY.

In 1976 ASC began commercially delivering The Wall Street Journal via satellite.

In 1982 ASC began commercially delivering the fledgling USA Today via satellite.

ASC contributed to Department of Defense communications systems and built the first digital satellite route from Hawaii to the U.S. mainland via a land base in California. The corporation also invented a shipboard antenna that could connect military vessels to satellite communications despite the pitch and yaw motion of the ship.

By 1978 ASC "established the first wideband digital data transmission service via domestic satellite for the Defense Meteorological Satellite Program".

In 1984, the corporation control became the largest U.S. transceiver satellite communications network.

The Transmission Operations department was responsible for operations and maintenance. The Network Operations Control Center was located at Vernon, NJ, and was later relocated to Ellenwood, DeKalb County outside of Atlanta, GA.

At the end of 1987, the Southeast Region consisted of the following sites:

- NASA Goddard Space Flight Center Greenbelt MD, DOD Ft Meade MD
- Fairchild Industries Gaithersberg VA, DOD Ft Belvoir VA, DOD Virginia Beach VA, DOD Damneck VA
- NASA Etam WV
- Allstate Insurance Charlotte NC, USA Today Greensboro NC, DOD Ft Bragg NC
- DOD Shaw AFB SC, Metropolitan Life Insurance Greenville SC
- DOD Savannah GA, USA Today Gainesville GA
- DOD McDill AFB FL, New York Times Lakeland FL, NASA Merritt Island FL, FAA Miami FL,
- DOD Hurlburt Field FL, DOD Eglin AFB FL, DOD NAS Pensacola FL
- NASA Marshall Space Flight Center Huntsville AL, SCI Huntsville AL, Lockheed Martin Huntsville AL
- Social Security Birmingham AL
- US Pencil and Pen Shelbyville TN, Dept of Energy Oak Ridge TN, Olin Mills Inc Chattanooga TN
- Federal Express Memphis TN
- DOD Ft Campbell KY
- NASA Slidell LA
- DOD Hattiesburg MS
- Abbott Labs, Puerto Rico.

American Satellite initially leased satellite service on the Western Union WESTAR satellites. American Satellite contracted with RCA Astro to build the ASC-1 satellite which was launched via NASA space shuttle Discovery mission STS-51-I on August 27, 1985. The satellite has 18 C-band and 6 Ku-band transponders. On C-band, the satellite had 12 each 36 MHz transponders that used Solid State Power Amplifiers (SSPAs) and 6 each 72 MHz transponders that used Traveling Wave Tube Amplifiers (TWTAs). The SSPAs had 8.5 watts of Radio Frequency (RF) power and the TWTAs had 16.2 watts of RF power. On Ku-band the satellite had 6 each 72 MHz transponders. The satellite had a Horizonal polarity beacon at 4100 MHz, a Vertical polarity beacon at 3700 MHz. The Satellite was parked at 81 degrees west. ASC-2 was launched via a Delta-7925 rocket from Cape Canaveral on April 3, 1991 and was parked at 101 degrees west. ASC-3 was not used and sold to PanAmSat.
