= Sherman Fairchild =

American businessman and investor (1896–1971)

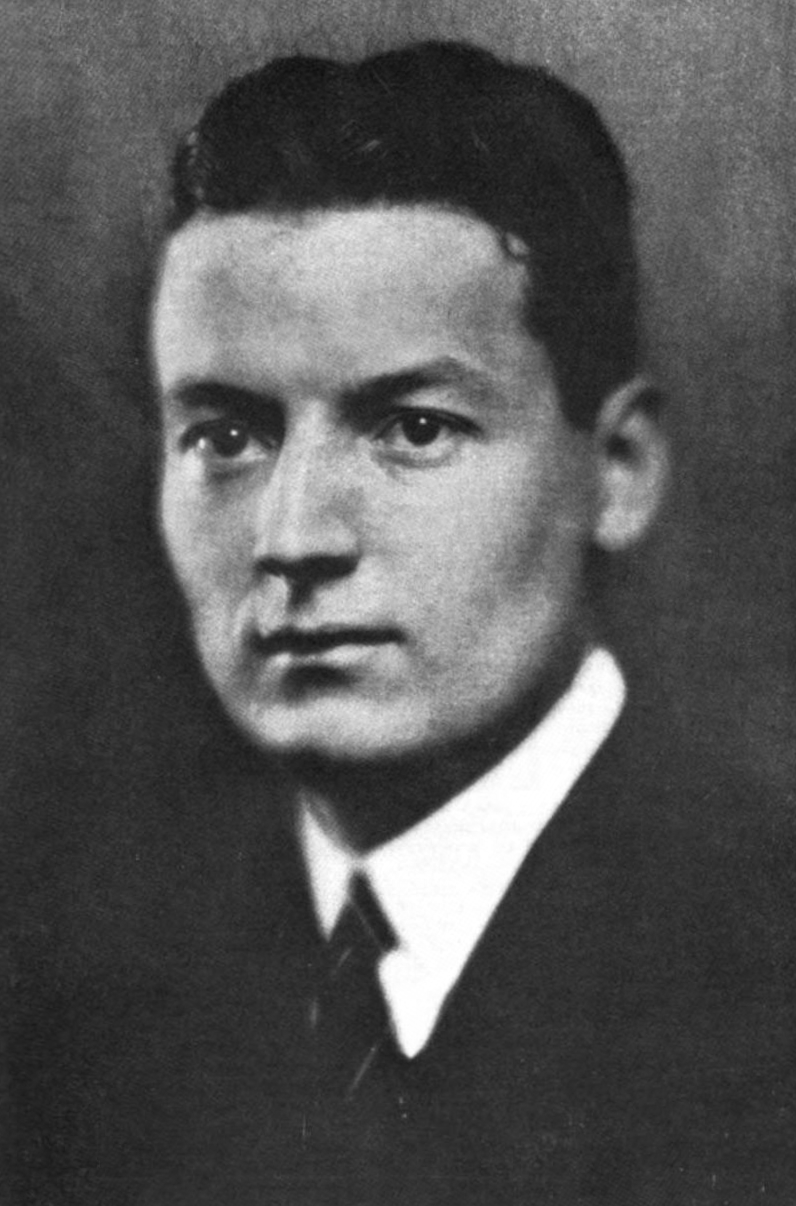
- Fairchild c. 1926
- Born: Sherman Mills Fairchild; April 7, 1896; Oneonta, New York, US
- Died: March 28, 1971 (aged 74); New York City, US
- Education: Harvard University; University of Arizona; Columbia University
- Occupations: Industrialist; inventor; engineer; investor
- Parent(s): George Winthrop Fairchild; Josephine Mills Sherman

Sherman Mills Fairchild (April 7, 1896 – March 28, 1971) was an American industrialist, inventor, engineer and investor who founded over 70 companies, including Fairchild Aviation, Fairchild Industries, and Fairchild Camera and Instrument. Fairchild made significant contributions to the aviation industry and was inducted into the National Aviation Hall of Fame in 1979. His Semiconductor Division of Fairchild Camera played a defining role in Silicon Valley. He held over 30 patents for products ranging from the silicon semiconductor to the 8-mm home sound motion-picture camera. Fairchild was responsible for inventing the first synchronized camera shutter and flash as well as developing technologies for aerial cameras that were later used on the Apollo Missions.

== Early life and education ==
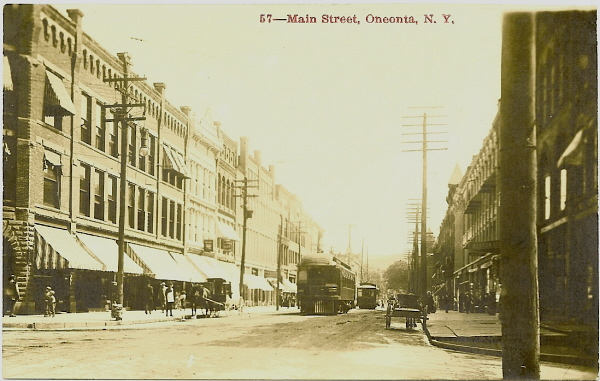
Main Street Oneonta, New York 1909

Born in Oneonta, New York, Sherman Fairchild was the only child of George Winthrop Fairchild (1854–1924) and Josephine Mills Sherman (1859–1924). His father was a Republican Congressman as well as a co-founder and the first Chairman of IBM. His mother was the daughter of William Sherman, of Davenport, Iowa.

As an only child he inherited his father's multimillion-dollar estate after his father died on December 31, 1924. He also inherited his father's IBM stock, becoming IBM's largest individual stockholder until his death in 1971.

Known to be a particularly bright and naturally inquisitive child, Fairchild matriculated at Harvard University in 1915 where, in his freshman year, he invented the first synchronized camera shutter and flash. During his college years he contracted tuberculosis and, under the advice of his physician, moved to Arizona to take advantage of the dry climate to aid in his recovery. While there, he enrolled at the University of Arizona, where he became increasingly interested in photography. He later transferred to Columbia University in New York and was enrolled in Columbia College from 1919 to 1920, according to the official registrar. Due to his ongoing medical problems, Fairchild did not earn a degree from any of these schools. Instead he pursued his desire to become an entrepreneur.

== Aerial photography ==
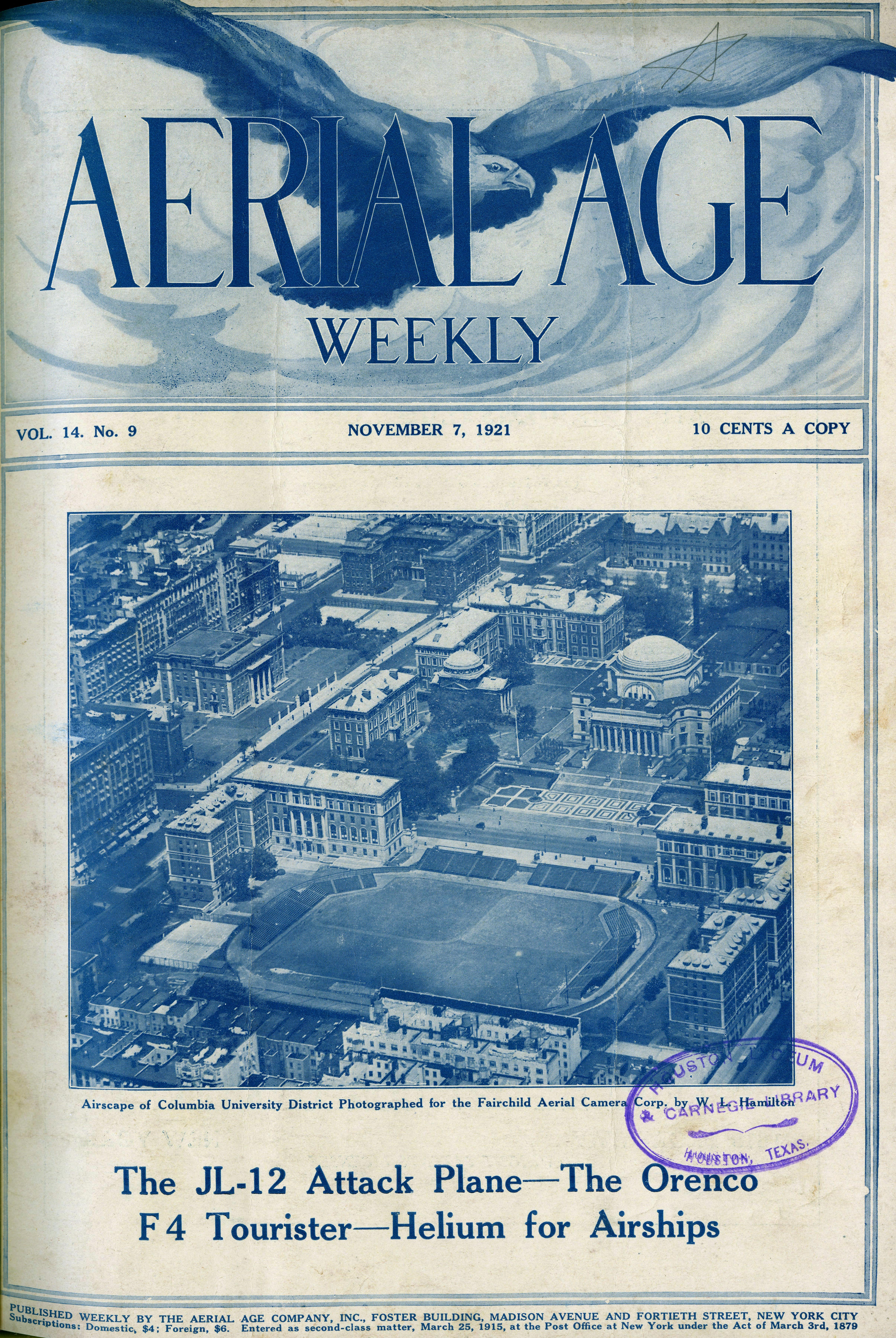
Aerial Age Nov. 7 1921, magazine cover with aerial photo of Columbia University shot by W. L. Hamilton for Fairchild Aerial Camera Corp.

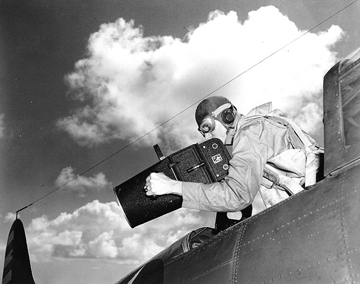
Fairchild F-1 Aerial Camera

In 1917, after being rejected from the military because of his poor health, Fairchild was determined to find another way to support the World War I effort. Fairchild and his father went to Washington and won a government contract to develop an improved aerial camera. The camera featured a shutter that was inside the lens, thereby reducing the significant image distortion caused by the slow shutter speeds that could not keep up with the movement of the plane. The U.S. government gave Fairchild a budget of $7,000; the project, however, ended up costing $40,000; his father paid the difference. Although the military did not accept his camera until the war was over, the U.S. government did purchase two cameras for training. Undeterred, Fairchild focused his attention on developing a more advanced camera, and in February 1920 he established the Fairchild Aerial Camera Corporation (predecessor of Fairchild Camera and Instrument). Shortly thereafter the U.S. Army ordered 20 additional Fairchild cameras and selected it as the standard for aerial cameras. The need for Fairchild's aerial cameras continued to grow; during World War II over 90% of all aerial cameras used by Allied Forces were of Fairchild design or manufacture.

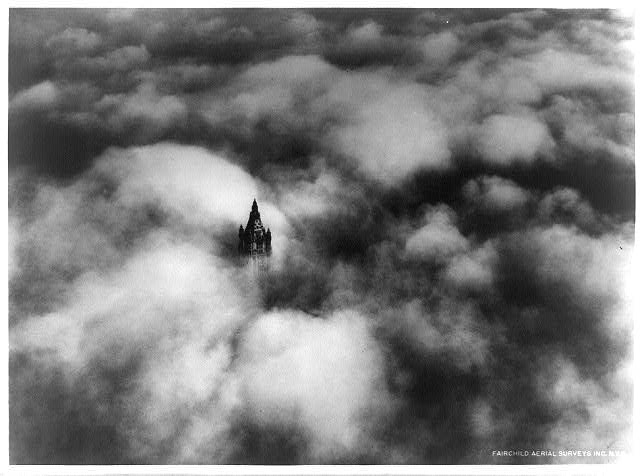
Famous view of the Woolworth Building in 1928, Fairchild Aerial Surveys Inc.

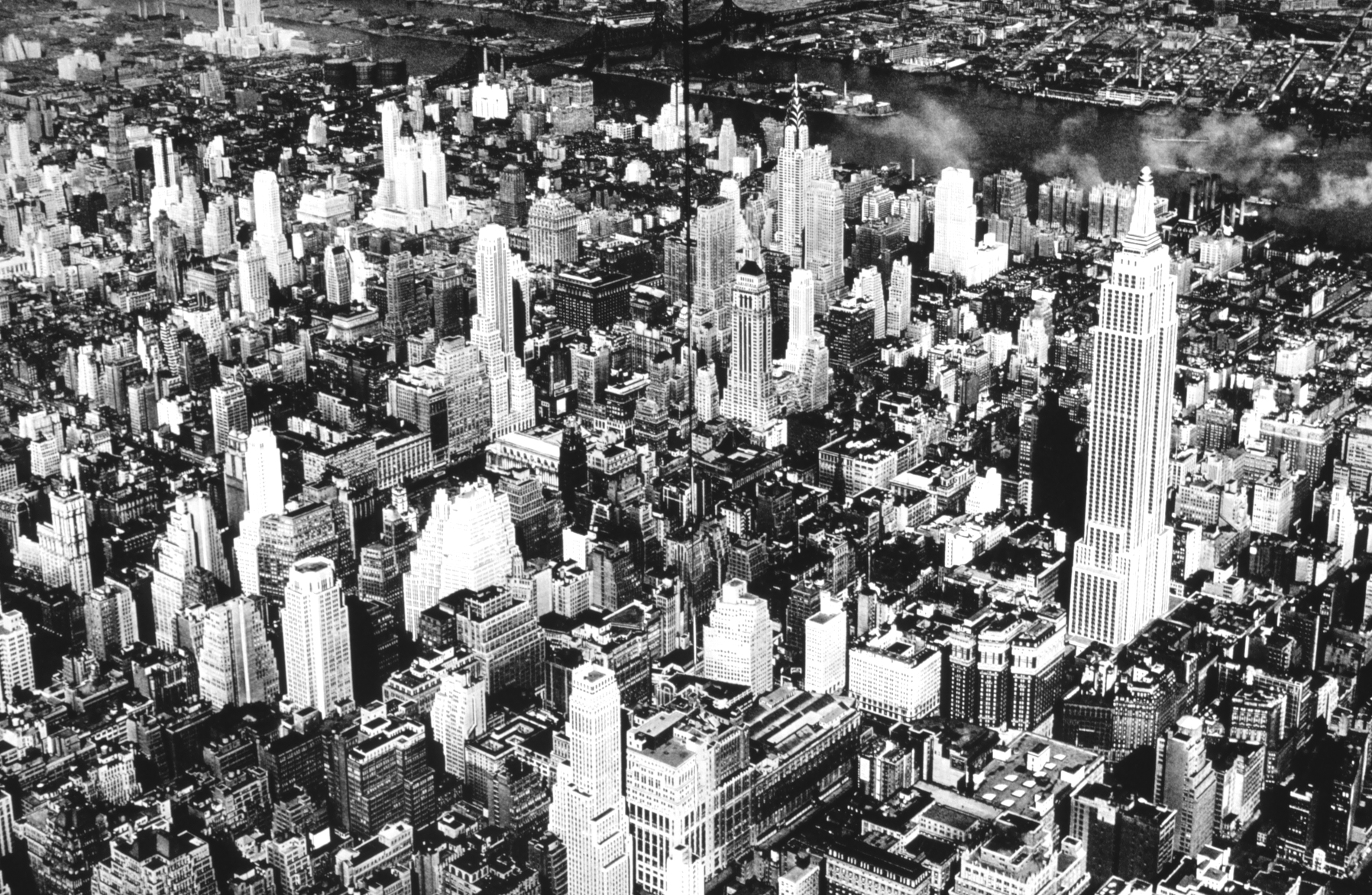
New York City 1932 Fairchild Aerial Surveys Inc.

=== Fairchild Aerial Surveys ===
Fairchild wanted to expand the capabilities of his cameras for map making and aerial surveying. In 1921, he formed Fairchild Aerial Surveys and bought a surplus World War I Fokker D.VII biplane to take his aerial photographs. Shortly afterward, Fairchild landed a contract to make a photomap of Newark, New Jersey, which was the first aerial mapping of a major city. In 1923, Fairchild formed Fairchild Aerial Surveys of Canada, Limited after he was asked by the chief forester of the Laurentide Paper Company to perform aerial surveys of Canada. Back in the United States he made an aerial map of Manhattan Island which became a commercial success and was implemented by several New York businesses. Other cities began using aerial mapping, as they found it was faster and less expensive than the ground surveys of the time. Aerial photography proved to be a successful commercial venture. To accommodate this growing commercial demand for aerial surveys, Fairchild established Fairchild Aerial Surveys in the United States. Among Fairchild's aerial photographers during the 1920s was Edith Keating, one of the first female aerial photographers and later an advocate for the inclusion of women pilots in WWII. In 1965 Fairchild sold Fairchild Aerial Surveys to Aero Services, Inc., which decided to keep only the more recent photographs and dispose of the others. A former Fairchild employee learned of this plan and was able to get the older material to three Southern California Institutions, Whittier College, UCLA, and California State University at Northridge, where he knew professors who would put the material to good use. Whittier College closed access to the photographs in 2010, and in 2012 the collection was put up for sale. The University of California Santa Barbara acquired the collection in December, 2012.

=== Lunar photography ===
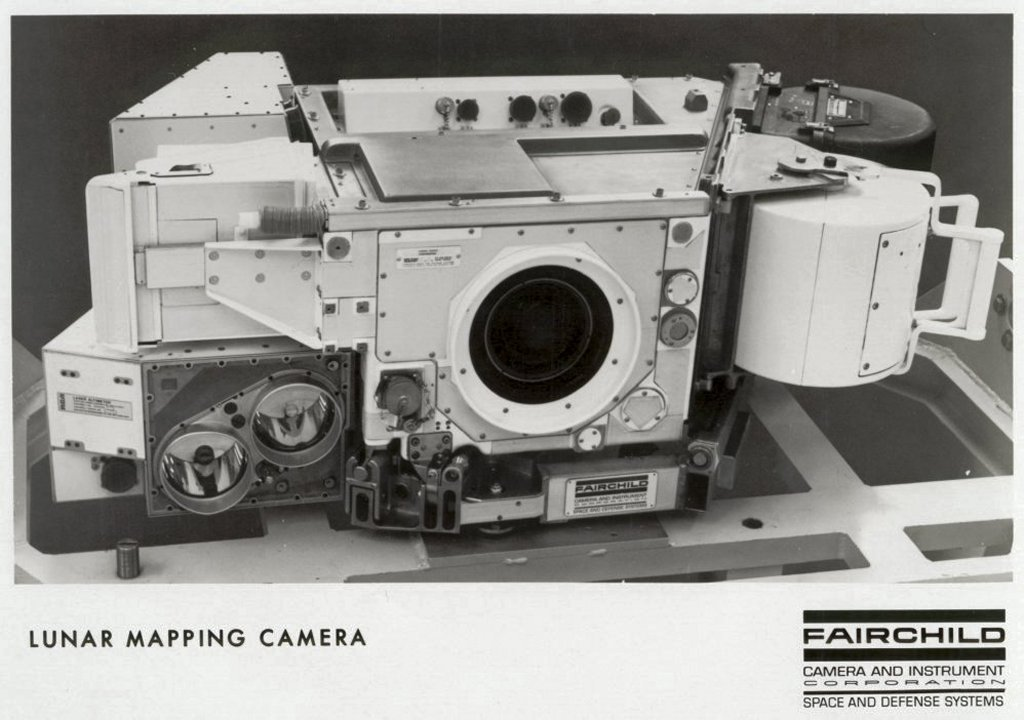
The Fairchild Lunar Mapping Camera

Fairchild Corporation developed the Fairchild Lunar Mapping Camera (also known as the Metric Camera) for NASA. The camera was carried on Apollo 15, 16, and 17 and took photos from lunar orbit throughout the missions. Over 7,000 frames were captured by the Lunar Mapping Cameras, covering approximately 20% of the lunar surface. These frames were used to produce topographic photo maps of the moon.

== Airplane manufacturing ==
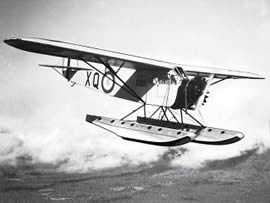
FC-2

Fairchild soon realized that existing planes were not suitable for the type of maneuvering and extreme conditions that were often encountered during aerial photography. In 1925, he formed the Fairchild Aviation Corporation in Long Island, New York, to build the Fairchild FC-1, an aircraft specifically designed to provide accurate aerial mapping and surveying. Fairchild was a dominant force in the aviation industry during this period, becoming one of the nation's largest manufacturers of commercial aircraft. Between 1927 and 1930, the company delivered over 300 of the FC-2, the production version of the FC-1 aerial mapping aircraft The aircraft could hold up to five passengers and could also be equipped with float or ski landing gear. The FC-2 was later chosen to accompany Charles A. Lindbergh on his 23,000-mile (37,000 km) tour of America. It also carried the first international airmail from Key West, Florida to Havana, Cuba. In the span of 9 months, Fairchild went from initial production to being the second largest aircraft producer in the world.

Fairchild Aviation Logo

Fairchild created, purchased, merged and sold his aviation company several times. He incorporated Fairchild Aviation Corporation as a holding company for all his other endeavors, with two of its largest subsidiaries being the Fairchild Airplane Manufacturing Corporation of Farmingdale, New York, and the Kreider-Reisner Aircraft Company of Hagerstown, Maryland. The Aviation Corp (AVCO) purchased Fairchild Aviation and its subsidiaries in 1930; however, in the following year Fairchild repurchased Fairchild Aviation Corp and eventually all its subordinate companies. In 1936, Fairchild Aviation divested all of its aircraft manufacturing interests into the new Fairchild Engine and Airplane Co.

=== History of acquisitions, mergers and divestitures ===
Created in 1924, Fairchild Airplane and Manufacturing Co. was the original aircraft manufacturing subsidiary of Fairchild Aviation Corp. Its primary purpose was to design and build aircraft for Fairchild's aerial cameras. It was purchased by AVCO in 1930, then combined with Fairchild Engine Co. to form American Airplane and Engine Corp, which then bought American Airplane and Engine in 1934 to become Fairchild Aircraft Manufacturing and Engine Co. In the 1936 reorganization it became Fairchild Engine and Airplane Co. and took control over all Fairchild Aircraft and engine holdings. In 1950, it became Fairchild Engine and Airplane Company.

During the 1960s Fairchild went through a series of changes and acquisition. The company was renamed Fairchild-Stratos Corporation in 1961, and began building meteoroid detection satellites for NASA as well as cameras that were used during the Apollo missions. After acquiring Hiller Aircraft in 1964, it became Fairchild Hiller. Later that same year Fairchild acquired Republic Aviation, which became the Republic Aviation Division of Fairchild Hiller. Fairchild created the Space & Electronic Systems division in 1965 to produce spacecraft and subsystems. The division also manufactured parts for the F-4 Phantom and the Boeing 747 Jumbo Jet.

=== Kreider-Reisner Aircraft Co. ===
In 1929, Fairchild acquired a controlling interest in the Kreider-Reisner Co. and began building new manufacturing facilities at the Hagerstown Airfield. During the Great Depression he consolidated his aircraft business in Hagerstown to form the Fairchild Aircraft Corp in 1935, which became his principal US aircraft manufacturing subsidiary. The plant began manufacturing new aircraft, including the Fairchild Model 22 (1931), Model 24 (1932), Model 95 (1934 – USAAC XC-31), Model 91, Jungle Clipper (1935), Model 45 (1935) and Model 46 (1937). After numerous changes it became the Aircraft Division in 1967, which was broken up in a corporate reorganization after Fairchild's death.

=== Aircraft contributions ===
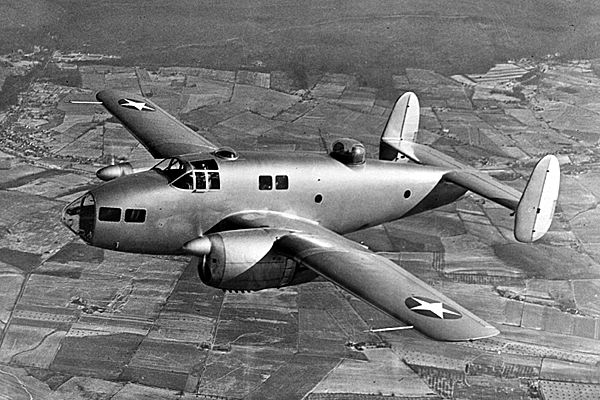
Fairchild AT-21 Gunner

Over the years, Fairchild airplanes played major roles in the military, ferrying, freighting, and surveying industries. In 1939, Fairchild bought a process developed by Virginius E. Clark in which a composite made of hot layers of plywood soaked with resin adhesive and bonded under pressure was used for building airframes. Fairchild was involved in the development and production of the process which he renamed Fairchild Duramold and then used on the AT-21 Gunner trainer. Before the outbreak of the war, Fairchild realized the large sales potential for trainers and developed the Model 62(M-62), which met the requirements for both military and civilian flying schools.

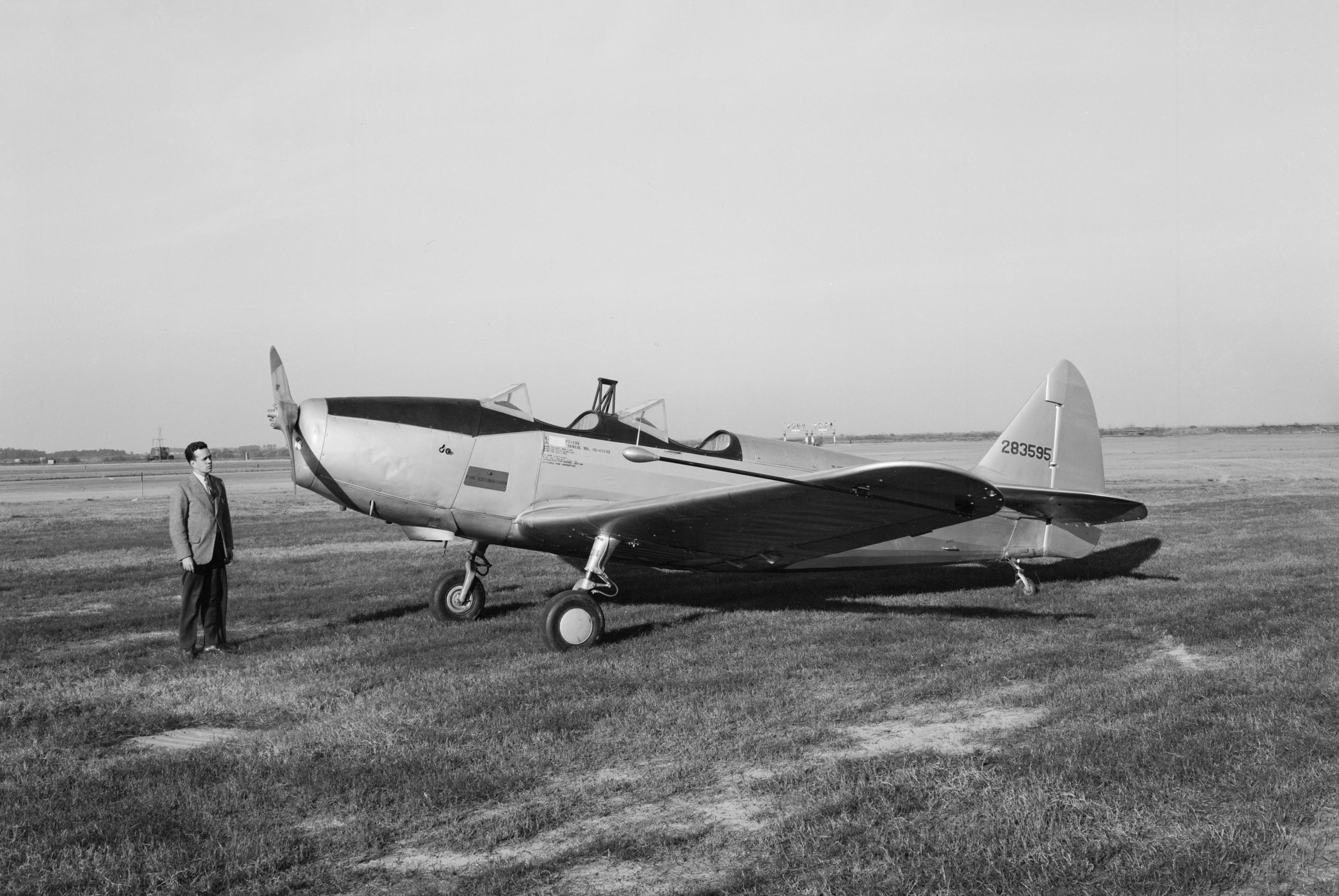
Fairchild PT-19

In the summer of 1939, he entered the plane in a U.S. Army competition against other primary trainer candidates. When the M-62 won the contest, the Air Corps awarded Fairchild with a contract for 270 planes to be designated the PT-19. The PT-19 model was the main product of the Fairchild plant in Hagerstown.

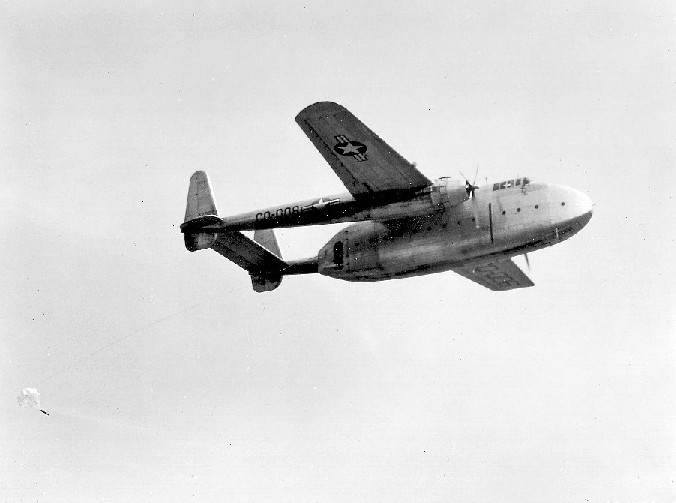
C-82 Packet

In 1942, Fairchild developed the Fairchild Model 78, which was designed specifically for military transport. He was awarded a military contract to build his large-capacity twin-boom plane, which featured a hinged rear door used to load bulky cargo to be designated the C-82 Packet. It was nicknamed the "Flying Boxcar" because the plane's cargo capacity of 2,870 cubic feet (81 m^{3}) was the same as that of a standard railway boxcar. It was used after World War II to fly assembled vehicles into Berlin. Fairchild was able to remain profitable after the war by manufacturing the C-119 Flying Boxcar, an upgraded version of the Packet which incorporated more powerful engines and greater capacity.

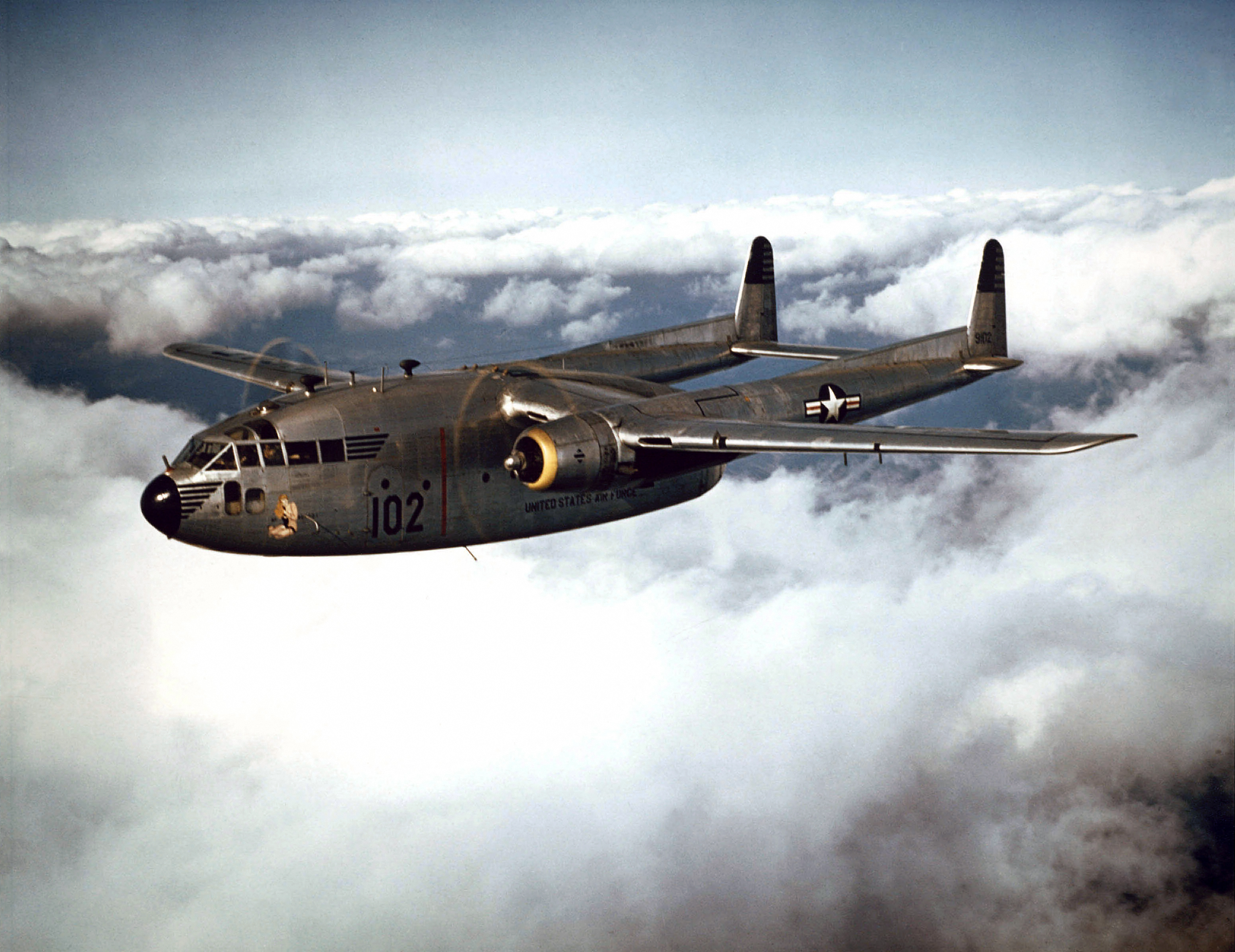
Fairchild C-119 Flying Boxcar

From December 1949 until 1955 over 1,100 C-119s were constructed. This was the last Fairchild design to be mass-produced. The C-119 was eventually converted into the AC-119, a night attack gunship used in the Vietnam War. In the 1950s, Fairchild manufactured the C-123 Provider, a short-range assault transport which was used for a variety of purposes, including spraying defoliants in Vietnam.

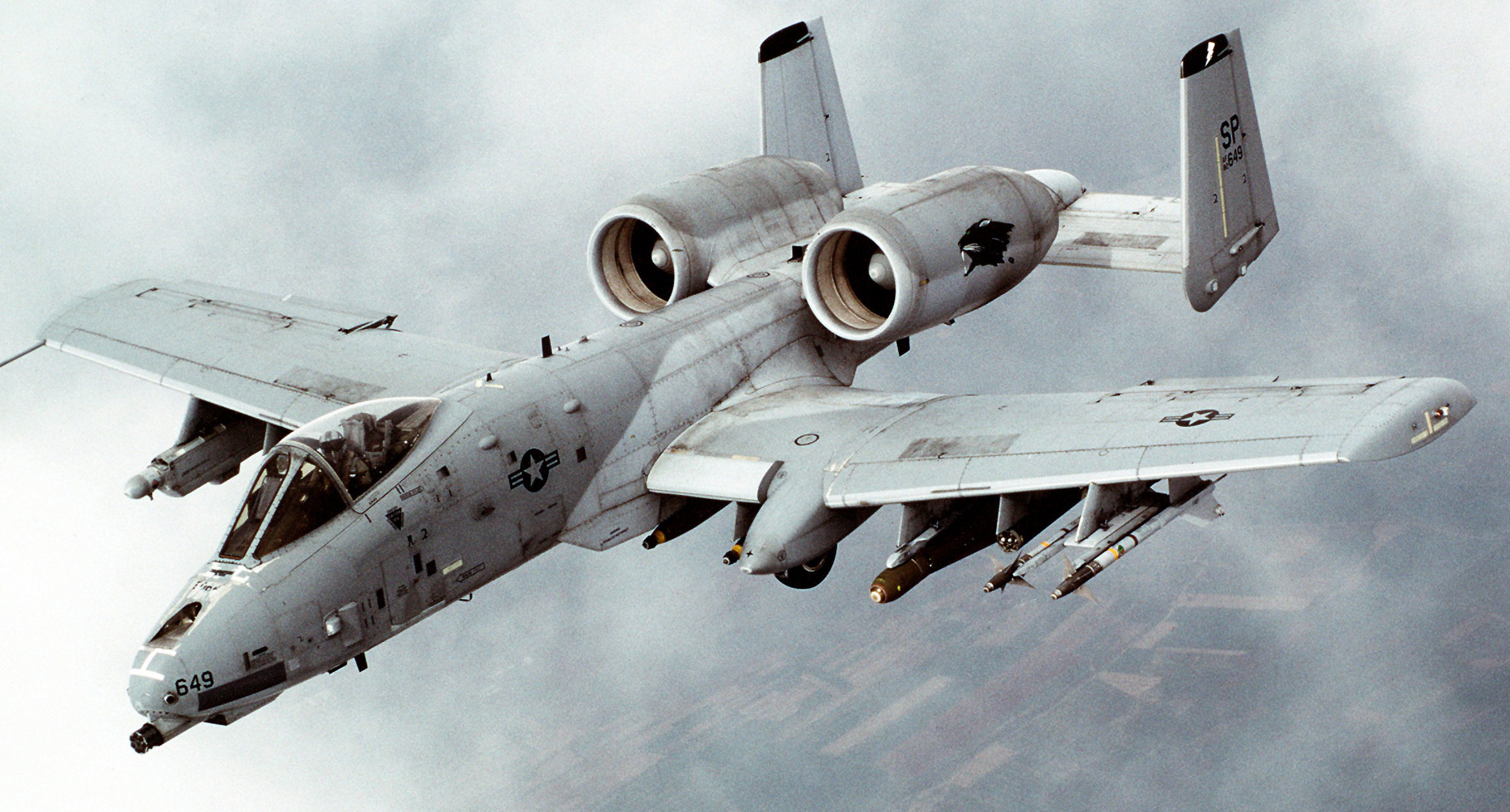
A-10 Thunderbolt II

In 1956, Fairchild built the Fokker F-27 Friendship passenger airplane, the first American-built airliner in service. Fokker licensed the design to Fairchild so it could be made in the US; Fairchild also made a stretched version of this aircraft called the FH-227. The 40-seat plane was also the first to offer its passengers air conditioning and pressurization within the short-haul marketplace. It became widely used as a "feeder" plane for commercial carriers across the globe. After acquiring Hiller Helicopters and becoming Fairchild Hiller in 1964, it introduced the FH-1100 civilian helicopter. On December 18, 1970, the Air Force selected Fairchild to develop the YA-10A prototype, which was the last aircraft project undertaken before Fairchild's death in 1971. Production of the A-10 Thunderbolt II began in 1974. It was nicknamed the "Warthog" because it was built as a workhorse and many felt it was ugly. It was used in 1991 at the start of Operation Desert Storm during the first ground battle. The planes took more responsibilities during the war, as they were strongly built and able to withstand considerable battle damage. After sixty years, the entire aircraft program was shut down in 1987 after the failure of the T-46A program.

== Audio recording venture ==
In 1931 Fairchild started the Fairchild Recording Equipment Corporation in Whitestone, New York, to augment his interests in photography and projection of images. Fairchild Recording Equipment Corporation developed the audio Fairchild 660 mono and 670 stereo dynamic range compressors.

== Personal life ==
Having never been married or had any children, Fairchild spent his time exploring a variety of interests. Aside from maintaining his companies, he enjoyed architecture, cooking, jazz, dancing, philosophy, and tennis. He always kept an eye out for opportunities to create or improve upon existing technology or capabilities.

== Death ==
Sherman Fairchild died on March 28, 1971, at Roosevelt Hospital in New York after a long illness. He was buried in Glenwood Cemetery in Oneonta, Otsego County, New York, within walking distance of his childhood home, which became the Oneonta Masonic Lodge.

=== Legacy ===
He left bequests to more than 50 relatives, friends and former employees. Most of the $200+ million estate went to two charitable foundations, the Fairchild Foundation and the Sherman Fairchild Foundation. The assets of the Sherman Fairchild Foundation in Chevy Chase, Maryland, have grown to over $500 million. Other bequests were $300,000 to Roosevelt Hospital, $200,000 to the Salvation Army, and $100,000 to the American Society for the Prevention of Cruelty to Animals, in memory of his aunt May Fairchild. The foundation donated $6.5 million to Columbia University, Fairchild's alma mater, for a new life sciences building.

== See also ==
- List of Sherman Fairchild companies
- Fairchild Aircraft Ltd.
- Fairchild Semiconductor
- Fairchild Camera and Instrument
- Traitorous eight
- Silicon Valley
