= List of Sherman Fairchild companies =

Sherman Mills Fairchild was an American industrialist, inventor, engineer and investor in the middle of the 20th century. His entire business holdings are not fully known, but a former Fairchild employee, Theron Rinehart, compiled an incomplete list of companies that Fairchild owned. The following is an incomplete list of companies that Sherman Fairchild established throughout his business career:

== Companies ==
- 1920 Fairchild Aerial Camera Corporation
- 1922 Fairchild Aerial Surveys (of Canada) Limited
- 1924 Fairchild Aerial Surveys, Inc
- 1924 S.M. Fairchild Flying Corporation
- 1925 Fairchild Aerial Camera
- 1925 Fairchild Caminez Engine Corporation
- 1925 Fairchild Airplane Manufacturing Corporation
- 1925 Fairchild Flying Company(name changed from S.M. Fairchild Flying Corporation)
- 1925 Fairchild Aviation Corporation (holding company for Fairchild Aerial Camera Corporation, Fairchild Aerial Surveys, Inc., Fairchild Flying Company, Inc., Fairchild Caminez Engine Corporation, Fairchild Airplane Manufacturing Corporation and Fairchild Aerial Surveys (of Canada) Ltd.
- 1925 Fairchild Aerial Camera Corporation
- 1926 Elliot-Fairchild Air Services, Ltd.
- 1926 Elliot-Fairchild Air Transport, Ltd.
- 1927 Fairchild Aviation, Ltd. (reorganization and refinancing of the following subsidiaries and minority holdings; Fairchild Aerial Camera Corporation, Fairchild Aerial Surveys, Inc., Fairchild Flying Company, Inc., Fairchild Caminez Engine Corporation, Fairchild Airplane Manufacturing Corporation, Fairchild Aviation, Ltd., Compañía Mexicana de Aviación, S.A. (20% stock) and International Aerial Engineering Company (20% stock)
- 1928 Faircam Reality Corporation
- 1928 Fairchild Boats, Inc.
- 1928 Fairchild Engine Corporation
- 1928 V.E. Clark Corporation
- 1928 West Indian Aerial Express, Inc.
- 1928 Fairchild Aviation of Illinois
- 1929 Kreider-Resner Aircraft Company, Inc. (82% stock)
- 1929 Fairchild Shares Corporation
- 1929 Fairchild Aircraft Ltd.
- 1930 Fairchild-American Photo Aerial Surveys, S.A.
- 1931 Fairchild Recording Equipment Corporation
- 1932 Fairchild Airplane Sales Corporation
- 1934 Fairchild Aircraft Corporation
- 1936 Fairchild Aviation, Inc.
- 1936 Fairchild Engine and Airplane Corporation (holding company for Fairchild Aircraft Corporation, Ranger Engineering Corporation and Fairchild Aircraft, Ltd. (50% stock)
- 1937 Duramold Aircraft Corporation
- 1938 Clark Corporation
- 1938 Fairchild Investments Corporation
- 1938 Molded Aircraft Corporation (name changed from Duramold Aircraft Corporation)
- 1938 Duramold Aircraft Corporation
- 1939 Ranger Corporation
- 1941 AL-FIN Corporation
- 1945 Fairchild Pilotless Planes Division formed by Fairchild Engine and Airplane Corporation
- 1945 Fairchild Personal Planes Division formed by Fairchild Engine and Airplane Division
- 1946 Fairchild-NEPA (Nuclear-powered aircraft engines) Division is formed by Fairchild Engine Engine and Airplane Corporation
- 1949 Fairchild Guided Missiles Division (name change from Pilotless Planes Division)
- 1953 Fairchild Speed Control Division formed by Fairchild Engine and Airplane Corporation
- 1953 Fairchild Aviation, (Holland) N.V.
- 1954 American Helicopter Division formed by Fairchild Engine and Airplane Corporation
- 1954 Fairchild Kinetics Division formed by Fairchild Engine and Airplane Corporation
- 1955 Fairchild Armalite Division formed by Fairchild Engine and Airplane Corporation
- 1956 Fairchild Electronics Division (name change from Fairchild Guided Missiles Division
- 1957 Jonco Aircraft Corporation
- 1957 Fairchild Semiconductor – Funded as a subsidiary of Fairchild Camera and Instrument Corporation.
- 1958 Fairchild Astronautics Division (name change from Fairchild Guided Missiles Division
- 1958 International Aluminum Structures Inc.
- 1960 Astrionics Division (name changed from Electronics Division)
- 1960 Aircraft Service Division
- 1961 Fairchild Stratos Corporation ( operating division; subsidiaries and affiliates: Aircraft Missiles Division, Aircraft Service Division, Electronic System Division, Stratos Division, Fairchild Arms International Ltd., Fairchild Aviation (Holland) N.V., and Aerotest Laboratories, Inc.)
- 1962 Space Systems Division formed by Fairchild Stratos Corporation
- 1962 Hiller Aircraft Company, Inc.
- 1964 Fairchild-Hiller Corporation (name change from Fairchild Stratos Corporation; division and subsidiaries; Aircraft Missiles Division, Aircraft Services Division, Electronics Systems Division, Inc., Fairchild Aviation (Holland) N.V. and Fairchild Arms International, Inc.
- 1965 Republic Aviation Company
- 1965 Republic Aviation Division
- 1965 Electronic and Information Division (formed by combining Electronic Systems Division, Data Systems Engineering and similar disciplines from Republic Aviation Company
- 1966 Burnes Aero Seat Company, Inc.
- 1966 Fairchild-Hiller-FRG Corporation
- 1966 Aircraft Division formed by combining Space Systems Division and Electronic and Information Systems Division
- 1966 Industrial Products Division forms from the Industrial Products branch of Stratos Division
- 1967 S.J. Industries, Inc.
- 1967 Air Carrier Engine Services, Inc.
- 1967 Fairchild Chemical Corporation
- 1967 EWR-Fairchild International
- 1968 Fairchild Marketing Company
- 1968 FAIRMICCO
- 1969 Fairchild-Germantown Development Company, Inc.
- 1970 Fairchild Aviation (Asia) Ltd.
- 1971 Fairchild Industries, Inc. Name change from Fairchild Hiller Corporation, division and subsidiaries: Fairchild Aircraft Marketing Company, Fairchild Aircraft Services Division, Fairchild Republic Division, Fairchild Space and Electronics Division, Fairchild Stratos Division, Burns Aero Seat Company, Inc., Fairchild Arms International, Ltd., Fairchild Aviation (Asia) Ltd., Fairchild Aviation (Holland) N.V., Fairchild-Germantown Development Company, Inc. and S.J. Industries, Inc
- 1971 Fairchild KLIF, Inc.
- 1971 Swearingen Aviation Corporation
- 1972 American Satellite Corporation
- 1972 Fairchild Minnesota, Inc.
- 1972 Fairchild International Sales Corporation
- 1979 Bunker Ramo Corporation (18.4% stock)
- 1980 American Satellite Company
- 1980 Space Communications Company (Spacecom) (25% stock)
- 1980 Saab-Fairchild HB
- 1981 Fairchild Swearingen Corporation (name changed from Swearingen Aviation Corporation, see SyberJet Aircraft)
- 1982 Fairchild Credit Corporation
- 1982 Fairchild Control Systems Company
- 1983 Fairchild Space Company and Fairchild Electronics Company (formed from Fairchild Space and Electronics Company
