= ATS-6 =

NASA experimental satellite

ATS-6, Advanced Tech. Sat. 6, ATS-F, PL-71A, 07318
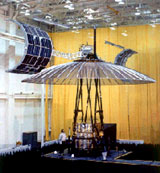
- ATS-6 Satellite ATS-6 satellite.
- Mission type: Communications; Technology
- Operator: NASA
- COSPAR ID: 1974-039A
- SATCAT no.: 07318
- Mission duration: 5 years

Spacecraft properties
- Bus: ATS-6 Bus
- Manufacturer: Fairchild Aircraft
- Launch mass: 930.0 kilograms (2,050.3 lb)
- Power: 645 W

Start of mission
- Launch date: May 30, 1974, 23:37:00 UTC
- Rocket: Titan-3(23)C (3C-27)
- Launch site: Cape Canaveral LC-40

End of mission
- Deactivated: June 30, 1979

Orbital parameters
- Reference system: Geocentric
- Regime: GSO
- Semi-major axis: 41,691.1 kilometres (25,905.6 mi)
- Perigee altitude: 35,184 kilometers (21,862 mi)
- Apogee altitude: 35,444 kilometers (22,024 mi)
- Inclination: 13.1º
- Period: 1,412 minutes

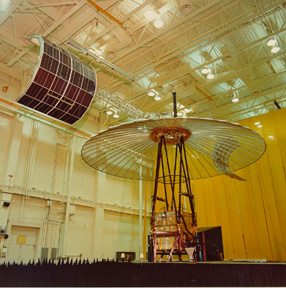
ATS-6 during radio-frequency tests.

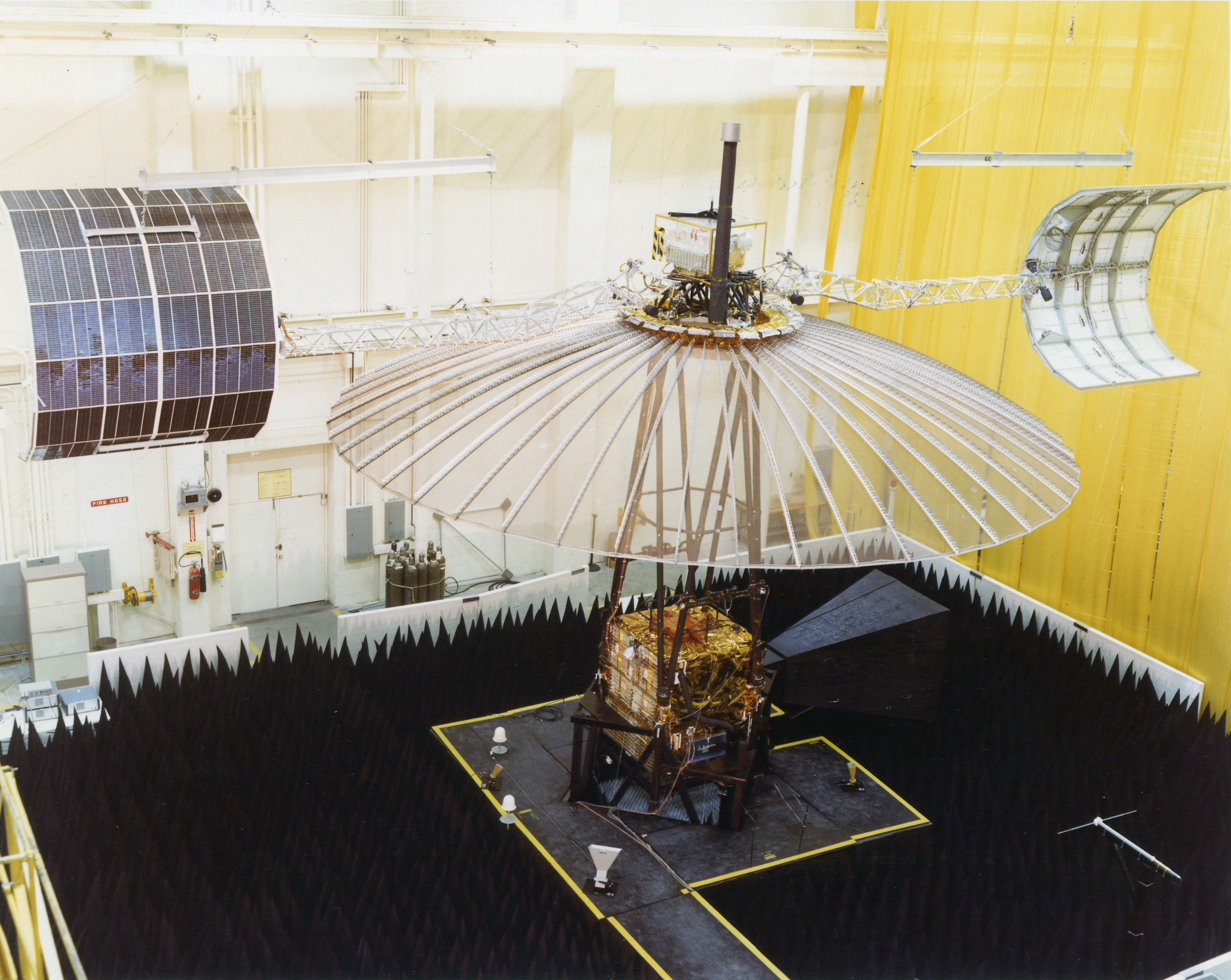
ATS-6 during radio-frequency tests.

ATS-6 (Applications Technology Satellite-6) was a NASA experimental satellite, built by Fairchild Space and Electronics Division It has been called the world's first educational satellite as well as world's first experimental Direct Broadcast Satellite as part of the Satellite Instructional Television Experiment between NASA and Indian Space Research Organisation (ISRO). It was launched May 30, 1974, and decommissioned July 1979. At the time of launch, it was the most powerful telecommunication satellite in orbit. ATS-6 carried no fewer than 23 different experiments, and introduced several breakthroughs. It was the first 3-axis stabilized spacecraft in geostationary orbit. It was also the first to use experimentally with some success electric propulsion in geostationary orbit. It also carried several particle physics experiments, including the first heavy ion detector in geostationary orbit.

During its five-year life, ATS-6 transmitted connection programming to various countries, including India, the United States and other regions. The vehicle also conducted air traffic control tests, was used to practice satellite-assisted search and rescue techniques, carried an experimental radiometer subsequently carried as a standard instrument aboard weather satellites, and pioneered direct broadcast TV.

ATS-6 was a precursor to many technologies still in use today on geostationary spacecraft: large deployable antenna, 3-axis attitude control with slewing capabilities, antenna pointing through RF sensing, electric propulsion, meteorological radiometer in geostationary orbit, and direct to home broadcasting. It is also possible that ATS-6 was a forerunner of the large ELINT satellites such as Mentor.

== Launch ==
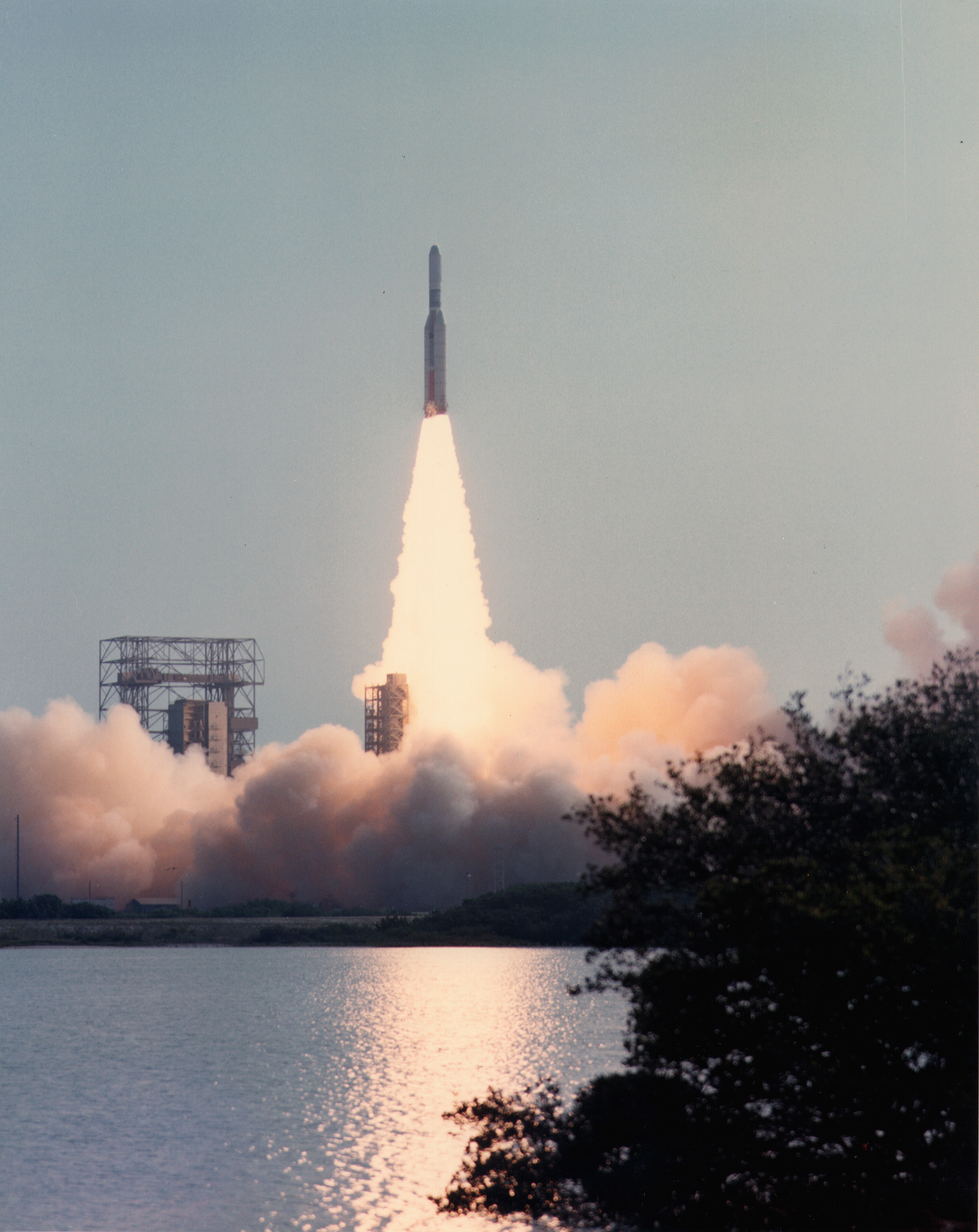
Titan III-C 3C-27 launching ATS-6

ATS-6 was launched on May 30, 1974, by a Titan III-C (3C-27) launch vehicle. The spacecraft was inserted directly in the geosynchronous orbit. This reduced the on-board fuel requirements to less than 40 kilograms (88 lb) (for a total mass at launch of nearly 1,400 kilograms (3,100 lb)). The highly accurate orbit insertion further lowered the amount of fuel required for final positioning to 9 kilograms (20 lb). This enabled a life extension from the original 2 year to 5 years, even accounting for the premature failure of the electric propulsion subsystem (the station-keeping fuel requirement being around 1.6 kilograms per year (3.5 lb/a)).

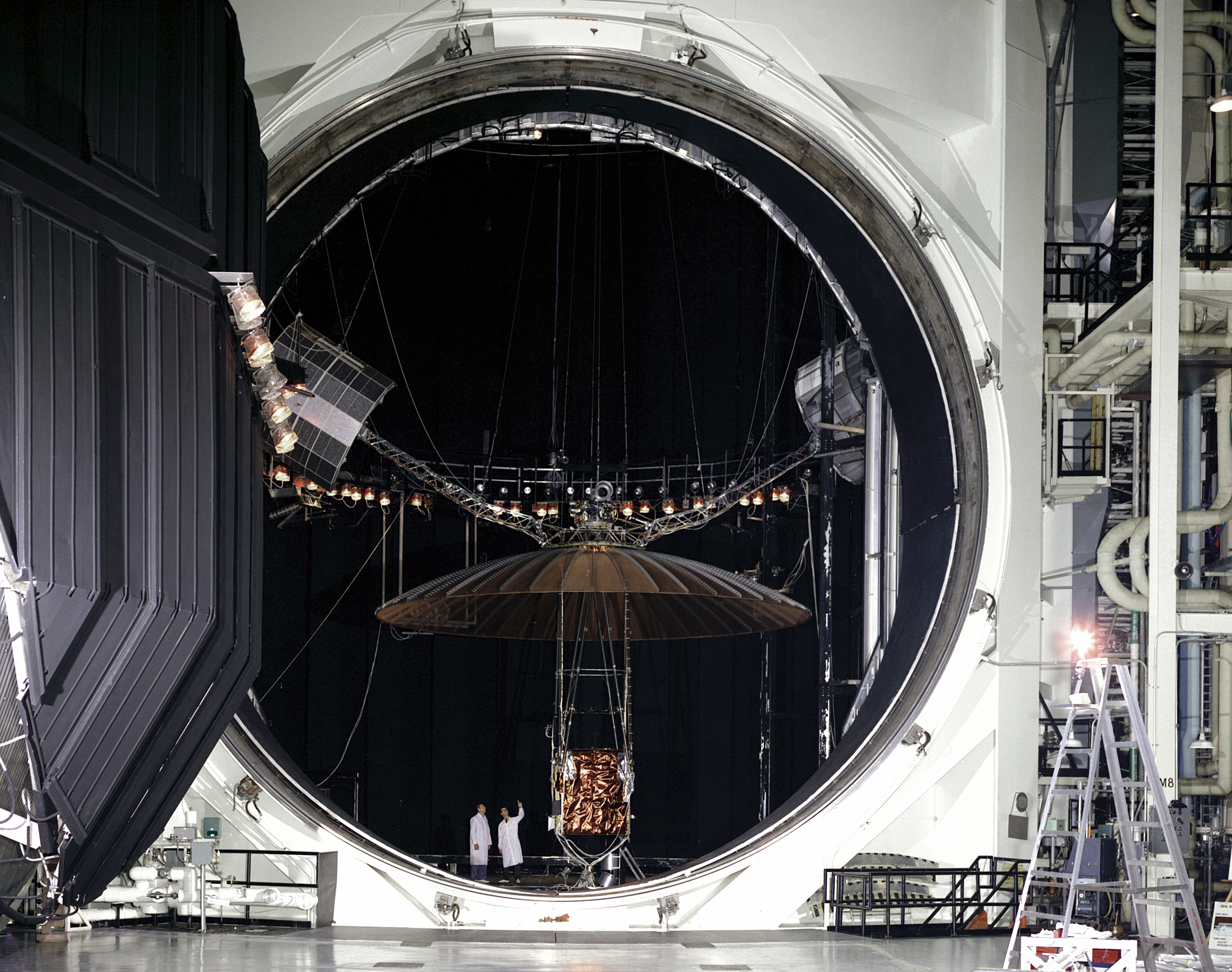
ATS-6 inside the Space Environment Simulation Laboratory at the Johnson Space Center (JSC) during antenna deployment tests

== Structure, power subsystem and antenna ==
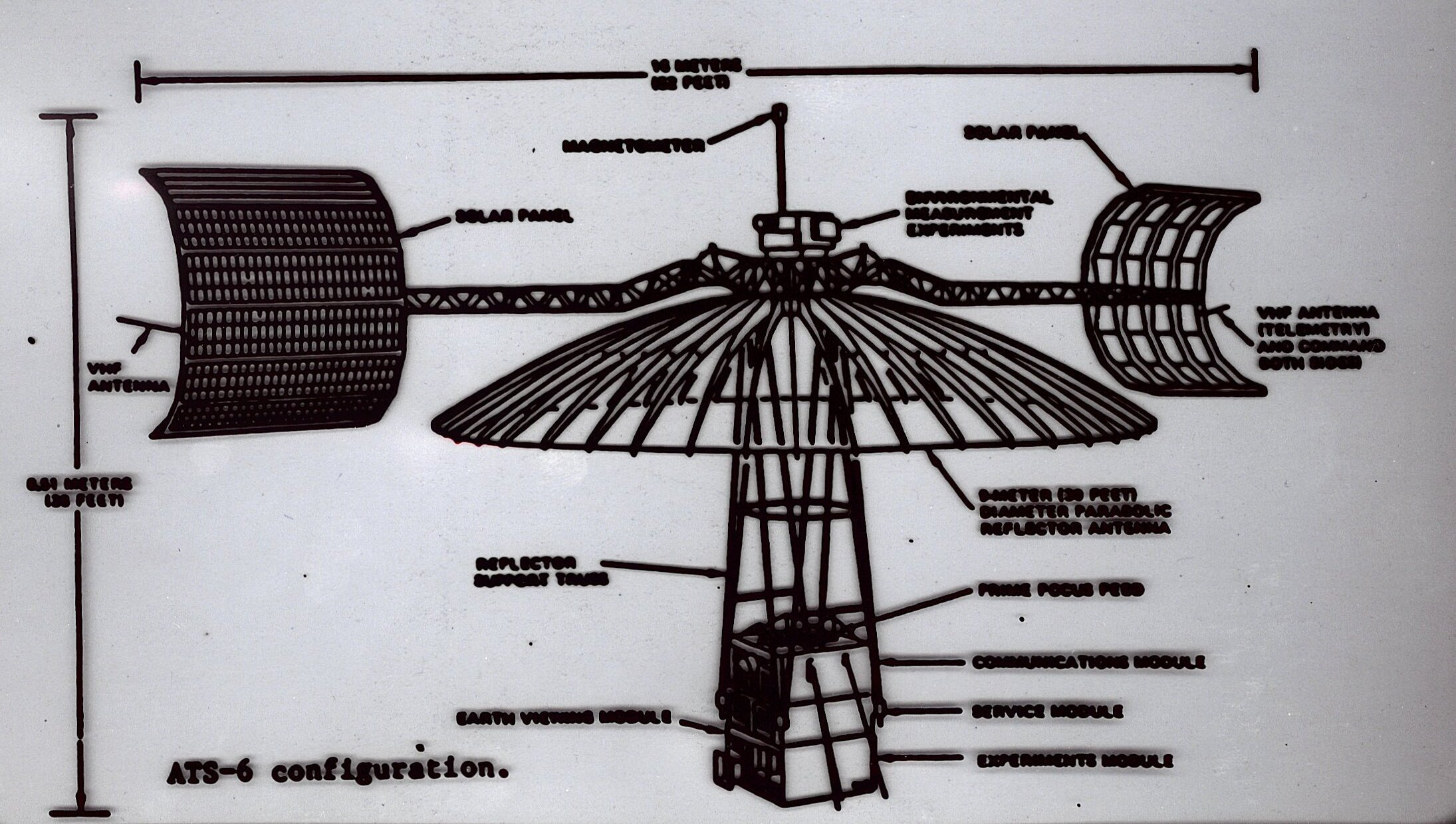
ATS-6 configuration

One of the major innovations of ATS-6 was an in-flight deployable antenna of more than 9 metres (30 ft) in diameter. The antenna reflector was furled during launch under the launch vehicle fairing, and was deployed in orbit much like an umbrella. The antenna reflector was built from 48 aluminum ribs, supporting a metallized Dacron mesh. The antenna feeds (in C, S, L, UHF and VHF bands) were placed on the spacecraft body, facing the antenna reflector, and linked to the antenna and the solar panels masts by a carbon-fiber reinforced plastic (CFRP) truss. The solar panels were rigidly mounted on two deployable masts. They were of hemi-cylinder shape, thus providing a relatively constant power (595 W beginning of life). Electric power was supplied during eclipses by two Nickel cadmium batteries of 15-A·h capacity, powering a regulated 30.5-V bus. The satellite dimensions in orbit were 15.8-metre (52 ft) width by 8.2-metre (27 ft) height.

This deployable antenna parabola was designed and developed by Lockheed Missiles and Space Company (LMSC), now Lockheed Martin, under subcontract to Fairchild Aerospace, after several years of small study contracts at LMSC. The program manager at LMSC was GKC (Colin) Campbell. The deployment of the reflector was initiated by pyrotechnically operated SQUIB cable cutters. Deployment time was on the order of 2.5 seconds producing 3,400 newton-metres (2,500 lb⋅ft) of torque at the spacecraft interface. The reflector surface was designed for optimal operation at S-Band frequencies. It weighed 83 kilograms (182 lb) at launch and stowed into a toroidal volume (doughnut shaped) approximately 1.8 metres (6 ft) in diameter and 250 millimetres (10 in) thick. Three models were fabricated, the STM or structural test model, the F reflector and the G reflector. The STM was destroyed by Fairchild shortly after the program was finished and the F model was launched with the spacecraft in 1972. The G model sat unprotected in the Farchild parking lot for several years before it was donated to the Smithsonian. Bill Wade, the assistant program manager and test manager on the program supported The Smithsonian in the restoration by providing a complete set of drawings and specifications and visited the Silver Hill facility to provide technical guidance.

At the time of launch it was the largest parabolic surface launched into orbit.

=== Three-axis stabilisation ===
ATS-6 has been the first geostationary satellite with three-axis stabilization and pointing., This subsystem was capable of a highly accurate pointing (better than 0.1° through the inertial measurement units, down to 0.002° by using a radio-frequency interferometer.). Furthermore, the satellite was able to follow low Earth orbit satellites through slewing, by tracking the low Earth-orbit satellite through an S-band RF sensing. The system was also able to perform orbitography of the tracked satellite, and was a precursor to the operational system TDRSS. This highly advanced (for the time) pointing subsystem used Earth and Sun sensors, a star tracker pointed to the pole star, Polaris, and three inertial sensors. The sensor measurements were fed to two digital computers (nominal and redundant), as well to a back-up analog computer. It was also possible to orient the satellite by using radio-frequency sensors. Actuators were three momentum wheels, and hot gas (hydrazine mono-propellant) thrusters. One of the momentum wheels having failed in July 1975, an alternative scheme was developed, allowing station-keeping with the two remaining wheels and thrusters.

=== Electric propulsion ===
ATS-6 was equipped with two electric thrusters based on the acceleration of cesium ions, that were to be used for North-South Station Keeping. This subsystem development followed earlier failed attempts on the previous ATS spacecraft. Each of the thrusters had a mass of 16 kilograms (35 lb), used 150 W of electric power, and produced a thrust of 0.004N, with a specific impulse of 2500s. The on-board supply of cesium would have been sufficient for 4400 hours of thrust. Unfortunately, both thrusters failed prematurely, one after 1 hour of operation, one after 95 hours. However, some of the experiments objectives could be met, such as the measurement of the effective thrust, the absence of any interference with the radio-frequency payloads (from 150 MHz to 6 GHz), no cesium redeposition on the critical parts of the payload (such as the radiometer), and the correct neutralisation of the spacecraft versus its environment.

== Payload ==
=== Radiometer ===
A radiometer was on board ATS-6, mounted on the earth-facing panel. This instrument was (for the time) of very high resolution. It operated on two channels: infra-red (10.5 to 12.5 μm) and visible light (0.55 to 0.75 μm). Images taken with the radiometer covered the whole earth disk, with a resolution of 1,200 lines of 2,400 pixels each (11-kilometre (6.8 mi) square pixel in infrared, and 5.5-kilometre (3.4 mi) square in visible light). The IR detector was passively cooled at 115K, and the visible light detector maintained at 300K. A complete image of earth's disk was transmitted to ground every 25 minutes. Several hundreds images were taken and transmitted, until a mechanical component of the radiometer failed, two and a half months after launch.

=== Telecommunication experiments ===
Zone covered by the SITE Experiment

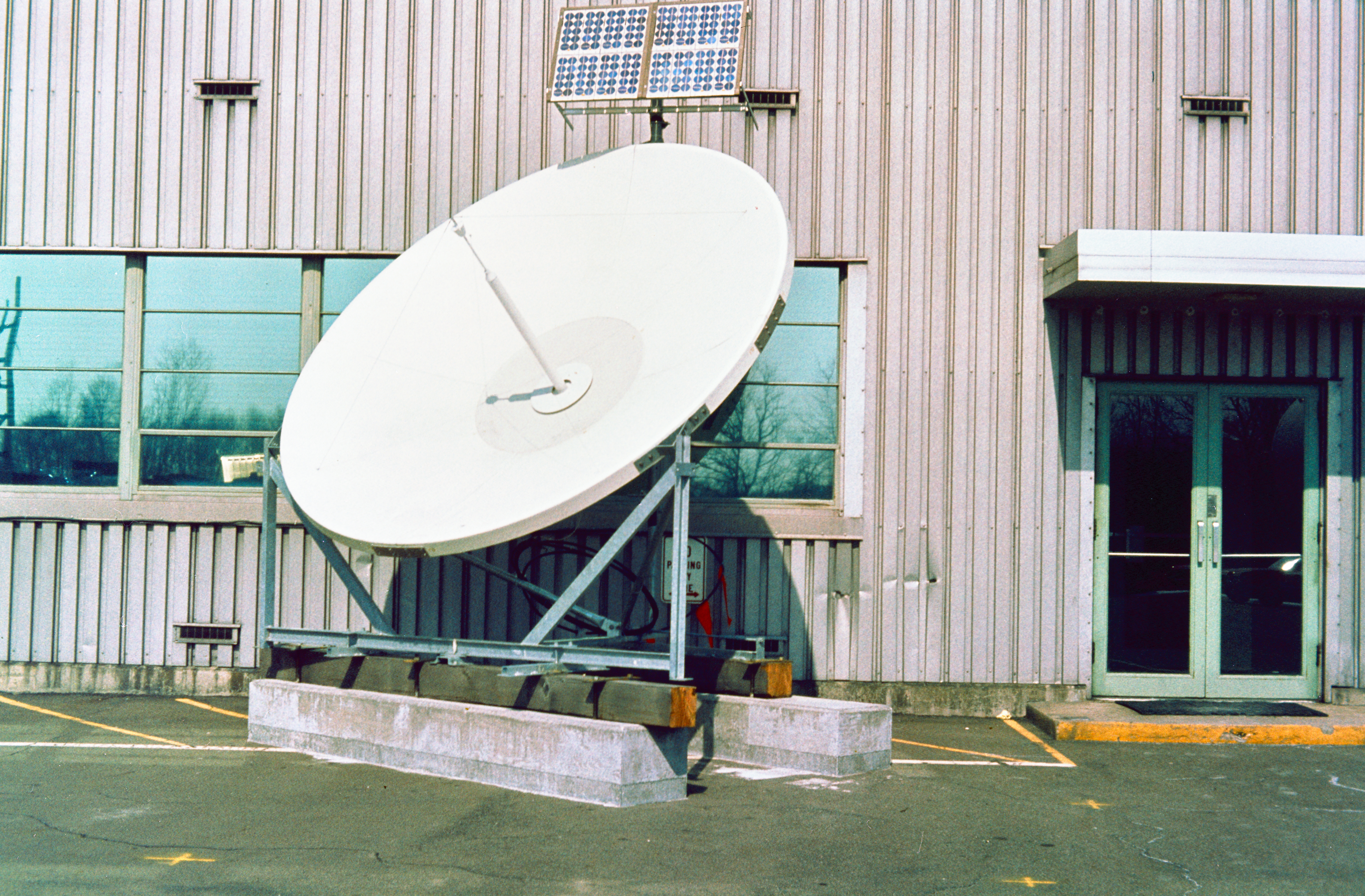
ATS-6 TV receiver and power source

The main mission of ATS-6 was to demonstrate the feasibility of direct-to-home (DTH) television broadcasting. To this end, in addition to the high-gain antenna, the spacecraft payload was able to receive in any of the VHF, C, S and L-bands, and to transmit in S-band (2 GHz) through a 20-W solid state transmitter, in L-band (1650 MHz) at 40W, in UHF (860 MHz) at 80W (which was used for the Satellite Instructional Television Experiment (SITE)), and with a TWTA-based transmitter of 20 W in C-band (4 GHz). The antenna produced two spots on earth of 400,000 square kilometres (150,000 sq mi) each, in which the TV broadcast could be received with 3 metres (9.8 ft) diameter antennas. This payload was first used over the United States for tele-education and tele-medicine experiments, from August 1974 to May 1975 as part of the HET, or Health, Education, Telecommunications experiment developed jointly by NASA and the US Department of Health, Education, & Welfare (now DHHS). The spacecraft was then moved over the geo-stationary arc from 94 °W to 35 °E, in collaboration with the Indian Space Agency (ISRO), who had deployed in India more than 2500 receive ground stations. The move of the satellite from 94 degrees West to 35 degrees East, a journey of 12,800 kilometres (8,000 mi), was actioned from the ground station at Rosman North Carolina This relocation involved 2 rocket burns of the onboard rocket motor. The 2nd burn lasting 5 hours 37 minutes and 17 seconds. The longest burn ever done by a chemical rocket in space at that time. A tele-education programme was started – Satellite Instructional Television Experiment or SITE – and run for one year. During the experiment, a receive station was offered by the Indian Government to Arthur C. Clarke, who was living in Sri Lanka. This experiment was highly successful, and encouraged ISRO to start building an operational program, with the Indian spacecraft INSAT IB (launched 1983). After the SITE experiment, the satellite was brought back over the United States, and served notably as a data-relay and tracking satellite for low-orbit spacecraft such as Nimbus 6, and for the Apollo-Soyuz flight.

=== Particle physics experiments ===
Several particle physics experiments were on board ATS-6. The most significant measured low energy protons (from 25 keV to 3.6 MeV), as well as detected heavy ions (up to 6 MeV). This latter experiment allowed to detect the first heavy ions (Z > 6) with an energy E > 4 MeV, in geostationary orbit.

=== Propagation experiments ===
Finally, ATS-6 embarked several radio beacons, which allowed to measure electromagnetic propagation properties of the atmosphere at 13, 18, 20 and 30 GHz.

== Decommissioning ==
By June 30, 1979, only one of the four ATS-6 station keeping thrusters was working, and was showing signs of unreliability. This thruster was used to move ATS-6 out of geostationary orbit to an orbit several hundred kilometers higher. This was to vacate the geostationary slot for the next satellite.

== See also ==
- 1974 in spaceflight
- Applications Technology Satellite
