= Fairchild 660 =

Tube-based audio compressor

Fairchild 660/670
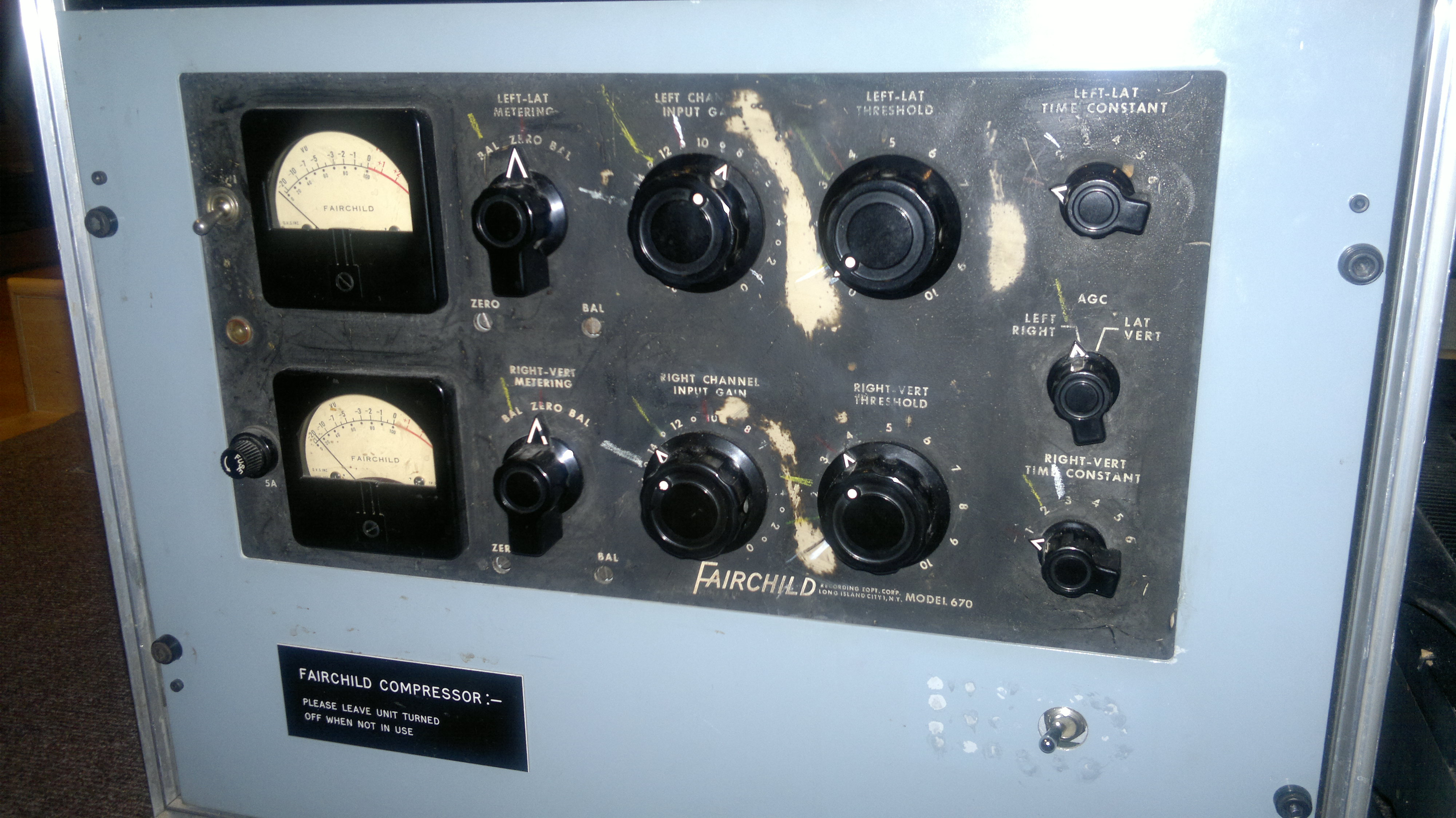
- Fairchild 670 Compressor/Limiter
- Brand: Fairchild
- Manufacturer: Fairchild Recording Equipment Corporation

Technical specifications
- Effects type: dynamic range compressor

Controls

Input/output

The Fairchild 660 is a tube-based single-channel audio compressor invented by Rein Narma and manufactured by the Fairchild Recording Equipment Corporation beginning in 1959. The 660 was the first intelligent automatic volume control limiter. The Fairchild 670, introduced shortly after the 660, is a dual-channel version. The rarity of Fairchild compressors has made them highly desirable and very valuable, so that a used 660 now sells for $20,000 or more and a 670 for $30,000–40,000 or more. They are commonly referred to as the "holy grail" of outboard gear.

== History ==
The 660 was designed by Rein Narma, who had worked with Les Paul to build a recording mixer to use with Les Paul's Ampex 8-track. Les Paul asked Narma if he would build a compressor/limiter. Sherman Fairchild, who was friends with Les Paul, learned of the compressor and licensed Narma's compressor design, hiring Narma to be chief engineer at Fairchild Recording Equipment Corporation. The first 10 Fairchild 660 were built by Narma himself. The first unit was sold to Rudy Van Gelder who used it to cut lacquer masters for Blue Note Records and Vox Records. The second unit went to Olmsted Sound Studios in New York City, and the third 660 built went to Mary Ford and Les Paul.

== Design ==
The mono 660 and dual-channel 670 can function as a compressor with a ratio of 2 to 1 and a threshold of 5 db below normal program level, as a peak limiter with a compression ratio of 30 to 1 and a threshold of 10 db above normal program level, or can operate anywhere between those two extremes. Using a single push-pull stage of amplification and an extremely high control voltage, the sound of the 660 and 670 is characterized by the complete absence of audible thumps, with extremely low distortion and noise. Both models feature an extremely fast attack time, producing the full limiting effect during the first 1/10,000 of a second. This fast attack time is combined with six different variable release timing curves, three of which make the release time an automatic function of the amount of limiting used, so that the 660 was the first compressor/limiter to feature automatic variable release time.

The 660 has controls for input gain, threshold, and time constant. The dual-channel 670 has the added flexibility of serving either as two independent limiters or as a vertical and lateral (sum and difference) component limiter. At the time of its introduction, the 670 was the only unit that could independently control both vertical and lateral components with a minimum loss of separation.

The 670 employs 20 tubes, 11 transformers, and 2 inductors. It is housed in a 14-inch rack-space unit and weighs 65 pounds.

== Notable users ==
... [W]e put the [drums'] sound through Fairchild 660 valve limiters and compressors. It became the sound of Revolver and [Sgt.] Pepper really. Drums had never been heard like that before."

— Audio engineer Geoff Emerick on the Beatles' song "Tomorrow Never Knows"

Abbey Road Studios purchased 12 Fairchild 660s after staff engineer Peter Bown heard it during a visit to Capitol Records in America, and used it on recording sessions for the Beatles, primarily for vocals. Beginning in 1966, Geoff Emerick began using the 660 on Ringo Starr's drum tracks as well as piano and guitar tracks. As of 2014, Abbey Road still had 8 of the original 660s purchased in the 1960s.

Other notable users include:

- Chris Thomas (on Pete Townshend solo albums)
- Jack Joseph Puig
- Tom Elmhirst (on the Amy Winehouse song "Rehab") and on the Adele song "Hello"

== Legacy ==
The dual-channel Fairchild 670 was inducted into the TECnology Hall of Fame in 2007.
