= Fairchild Recording Equipment Corporation =

American audio equipment manufacturer

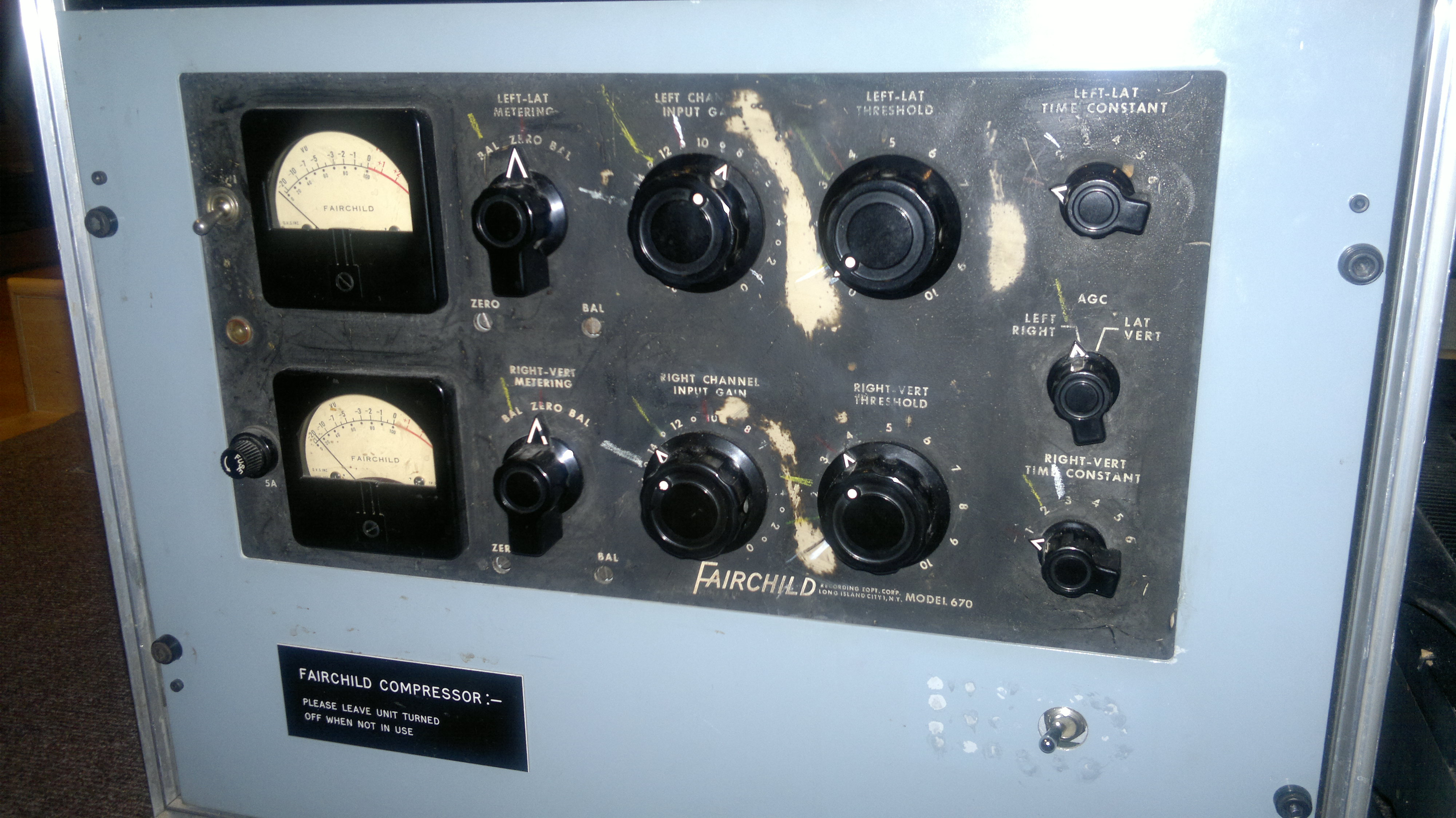
- Fairchild 670 compressor
- Industry: Electronics
- Founded: 1931; 95 years ago in Whitestone, Queens, New York, United States
- Products: Amplifiers, audio compressors
- Owner: Sherman Fairchild

Fairchild Recording Equipment Corporation was an American manufacturer of professional audio equipment located in Whitestone, New York.

== Background ==
The company was founded by Sherman Fairchild in 1931 to augment his interests in photography and image projection.

Fairchild's most notable products were the Fairchild 670 stereo compressor and its mono sibling, the Fairchild 660. These compressors can sell for over $30,000 as of 2003. The original design, created by Rein Narma as he was building Les Paul's first 8-channel mixing console, was licensed by Sherman Fairchild who hired Rein Narma as the company's chief engineer.

The company's products also included amplifiers, preamplifiers, a control track generator to synchronize tape recorders, and recording lathes.
