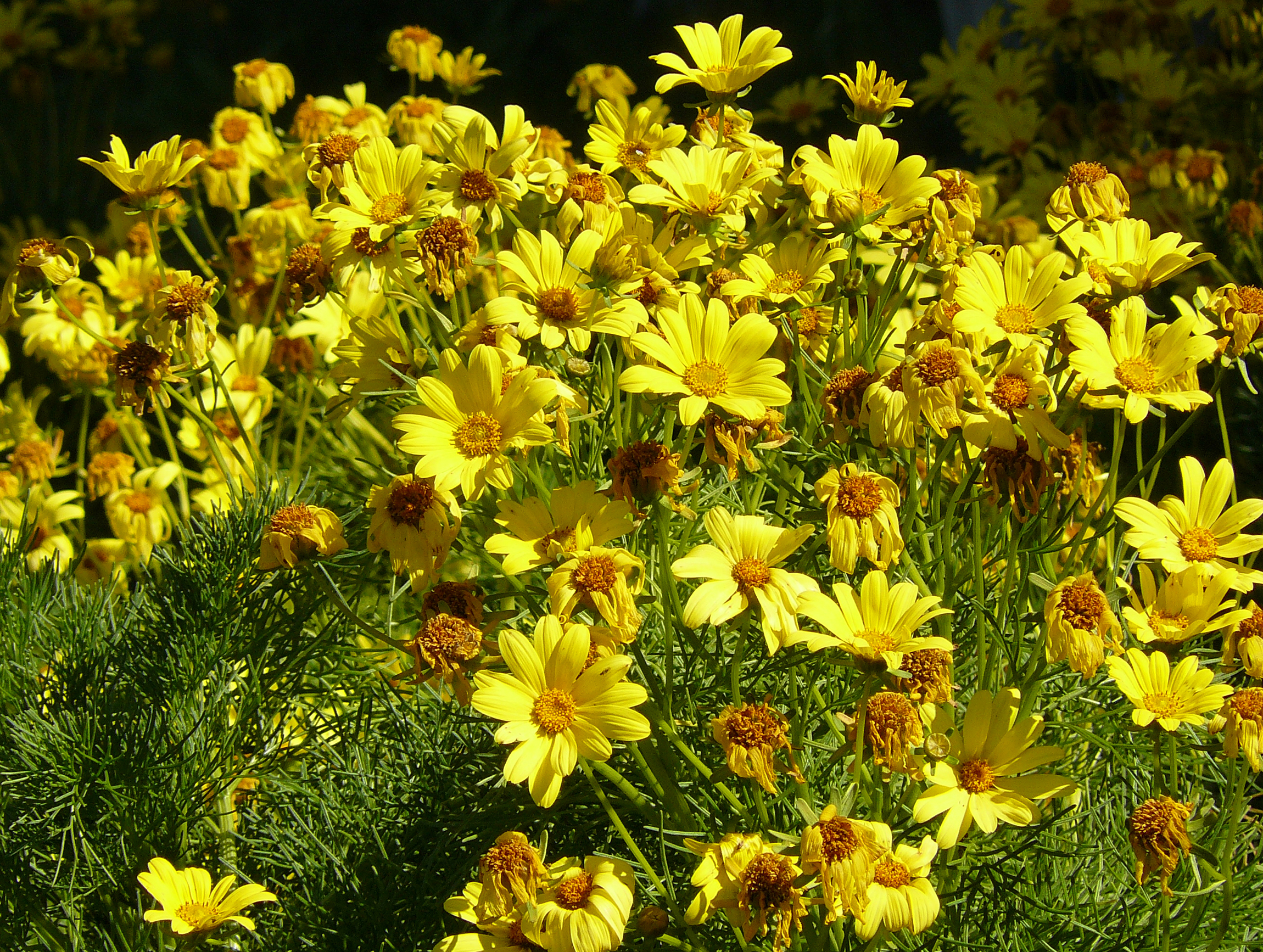
- Coreopsis gigantea

Scientific classification
- Kingdom: Plantae
- Clade: Tracheophytes
- Clade: Angiosperms
- Clade: Eudicots
- Clade: Asterids
- Order: Asterales
- Family: Asteraceae
- Subfamily: Asteroideae
- Tribe: Coreopsideae
- Genus: Coreopsis; L.

Species
- Many, see text

Synonyms
- Acispermum Neck.; Calliopsis Rchb.; Chrysomelea Tausch; Coreopis Gunnerus, orth. var.; Coreopsoides Moench; Cymbaecarpa Cav.; Diplosastera Tausch; Leachia Cass.; Lophactis Raf.; Odoglossa Raf.; Pugiopappus A.Gray; Selleophytum Urb.; Vernasolis Raf.

= Coreopsis =

Genus of flowering plants

Coreopsis (/ˌkɒriːˈɒpsɪs/) is a genus of flowering plants in the family Asteraceae. Common names include calliopsis and tickseed, a name shared with various other plants.

== Description ==
These plants range from 46–120 centimetres (18–47 inches) in height. The flowers are usually yellow with a toothed tip, but can also be yellow-and-red bicolor or pink. They have showy flower heads with involucral bracts in two distinct series of eight each, the outer being commonly connate at the base. The flat fruits are small and dry and look like insects.

There are nearly 40 species of Coreopsis, all of which are native to North, Central, and South America. The name Coreopsis is derived from the Ancient Greek words κόρις (transl. grc – transl. koris), meaning "bedbug", and ὄψις (transl. grc – transl. opsis), meaning "view", referring to the shape of the achene.

== Species ==
39 species are currently accepted by Plants of the World Online.

- Coreopsis aristulata LeBlond, Sorrie & Weakley
- Coreopsis auriculata L.
- Coreopsis bakeri E.E.Schill.
- Coreopsis basalis (A.Dietr.) S.F.Blake
- Coreopsis bolanosana Panero & Villaseñor
- Coreopsis breviligulata Sagást. & Sánchez Vega
- Coreopsis buchii (Urb.) S.F.Blake
- Coreopsis canescentifolia Sagást.
- Coreopsis falcata F.E.Boynton
- Coreopsis floridana E.B.Sm.
- Coreopsis gladiata Walter
- Coreopsis glaucodes S.F.Blake & Sherff
- Coreopsis grandiflora Hogg ex Sweet
- Coreopsis imbricata Sherff
- Coreopsis integra S.F.Blake
- Coreopsis integrifolia Poir.
- Coreopsis intermedia Sherff
- Coreopsis killipii Sherff
- Coreopsis lanceolata L.
- Coreopsis leavenworthii Torr. & A.Gray
- Coreopsis linifolia Nutt.
- Coreopsis longula S.F.Blake
- Coreopsis maysillesii Sherff
- Coreopsis mollicula Sagást. & Sánchez Vega
- Coreopsis multifida DC.
- Coreopsis nudata Nutt.
- Coreopsis nuecensis A.Heller
- Coreopsis nuecensoides E.B.Sm.
- Coreopsis paludosa M.E.Jones
- Coreopsis palustris Sorrie
- Coreopsis peruviana Sagást.
- Coreopsis piurana Sherff
- Coreopsis poloe Sagást. & Zapata
- Coreopsis pubescens Elliott
- Coreopsis rosea Nutt.
- Coreopsis spectabilis A.Gray
- Coreopsis teotepecensis Paray
- Coreopsis tinctoria Nutt.
- Coreopsis wrightii (A.Gray) H.M.Parker ex E.B.Sm.

=== Formerly placed here ===
- Anacis delphiniifolia (Lam.) Z.H.Feng, Z.J.Huang & Su Liu (as C. delphiniifolia Lam.)
- Anacis major (Walter) Z.H.Feng, Z.J.Huang & Su Liu (as C. major Walter)
- Anacis palmata (Nutt.) Z.H.Feng, Z.J.Huang & Su Liu (as C. palmata Nutt.)
- Anacis pulchra (F.E.Boynton) Z.H.Feng, Z.J.Huang & Su Liu (as C. pulchra F.E.Boynton)
- Anacis tripteris (L.) Schrank (as C. tripteris L.)
- Anacis verticillata (L.) Z.H.Feng, Z.J.Huang & Su Liu (as C. verticillata L.)
- Bidens alba (L.) DC. (as C. alba L.)
- Bidens aristosa (Michx.) Britton (as C. aristosa Michx.)
- Bidens aurea (Aiton) Sherff (as C. aurea Aiton)
- Bidens mitis (Michx.) Sherff (as C. mitis Michx.)
- Bidens trichosperma (Michx.) Britton (as C. trichosperma Michx.)
- Cosmos bipinnatus Cav. (as C. formosa Bonato)
- Cosmos parviflorus (Jacq.) Pers. (as C. parviflora Jacq.)
- Electranthera cuneifolia (Greenm.) Mesfin, D.J.Crawford & Pruski (as C. cuneifolia Greenm.)
- Electranthera mutica (DC.) Mesfin, D.J.Crawford & Pruski (as C. mutica DC.)
- Epilepis rudis Benth. (as C. rudis (Benth.) Hemsl.)
- Iostephane heterophylla (Cav.) Hemsl. (as C. heterophylla Cav.)
- Leptosyne bigelovii (A.Gray) A.Gray (as C. bigelovii (A.Gray) Voss)
- Leptosyne californica Nutt. (as C. californica (Nutt.) H.Sharsm.)
- Leptosyne calliopsidea (DC.) A.Gray (as C. calliopsidea (DC.) A.Gray)
- Leptosyne douglasii DC. (as C. douglasii (DC.) H.M.Hall)
- Leptosyne gigantea Kellogg (as C. gigantea (Kellogg) H.M.Hall)
- Leptosyne hamiltonii Elmer (as C. hamiltonii (Elmer) H.Sharsm.)
- Leptosyne maritima (Nutt.) A.Gray (as C. maritima (Nutt.) Hook.f.)
- Leptosyne stillmanii A.Gray (as C. stillmanii (A.Gray) S.F.Blake)
- Silphidium latifolium (Michx.) Mesfin & D.J.Crawford (as C. latifolia Michx.)
- Simsia amplexicaulis (Cav.) Pers. (as C. amplexicaulis Cav.)
- Simsia foetida (Cav.) S.F.Blake (as C. foetida Cav.)
- Thelesperma filifolium (Hook.) A.Gray (as C. filifolia Hook.)
- Verbesina alternifolia (L.) Britton ex Kearney (as C. alternifolia L.)
- Verbesina occidentalis (L.) Walter (as C. alata Cav. Pursh)

== Taxonomy ==
Coreopsis is a variable genus closely related to Bidens. In fact, neither Coreopsis nor Bidens, as defined in the 20th century, is strictly monophyletic. Coreopsis is best described as paraphyletic. Previously (1936), Coreopsis was classified into 11 sections and 114 species, but the African species were subsequently reclassified as Bidens, leaving the North and South American species, some 75–80 in all, under Coreopsis. 45 species are in the 11 North American sections, and the remaining 35 are in the South American section Pseudoagarista. The North American species fall into two broad groups, with 5 sections and 12 species in Mexico and North America and the remaining 5 sections and 26 species in Eastern North America.

One group which does seem to be monophyletic consists of temperate species from North America, including five sections of Coreopsis, Bidens coronata and Bidens tripartita, and the genus Thelesperma (five species).

Plants of the World Online accepts the genera Anacis Schrank, Electranthera Mesfin, D.J.Crawford & Pruski, Epilepis Benth., Leptosyne DC., and Silphidium (Torr. & A.Gray) Mesfin & D.J.Crawford, which other authorities, including the Global Compositae Database, treat as synonyms of Coreopsis. Plants of the World Online treats Selleophytum as a synonym of Coreopsis.

=== Sections ===
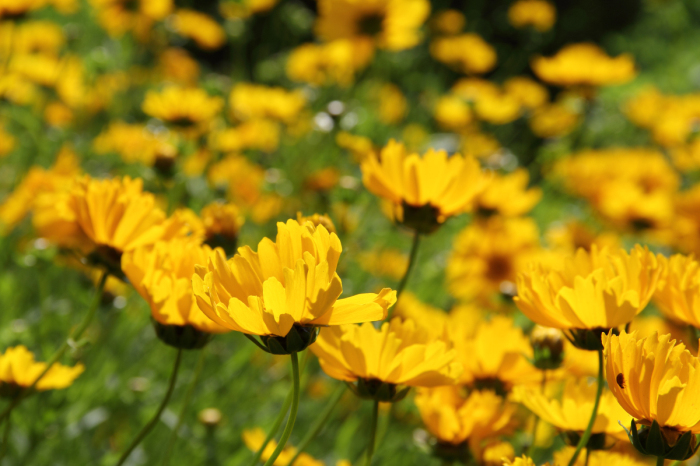
Coreopsis lanceolata

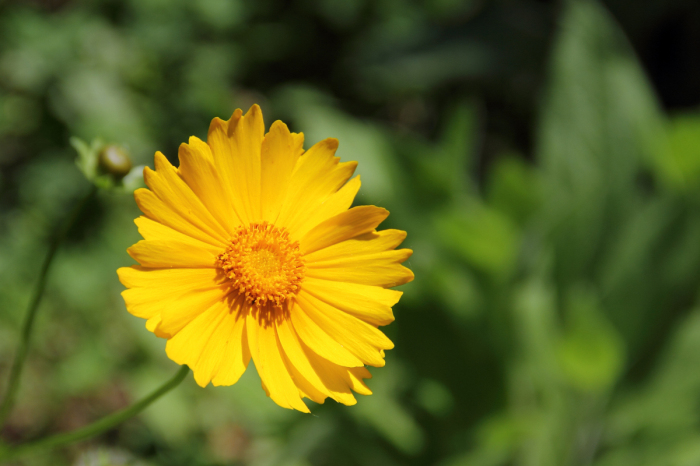
Coreopsis lanceolata

One classification (GRIN) of the genus consists of eleven sections, shown by cladistic relationships with number of species in parentheses.

Coreopsis sect. Pseudoagarista (35)

==== Section Anathysana ====
- Coreopsis cyclocarpa S.F.Blake

==== Section Calliopsis ====
- Coreopsis bicolor
- Coreopsis leavenworthii Torr. & A.Gray – Leavenworth's tickseed
- Coreopsis paludosa M.E.Jones
- Coreopsis tinctoria Nutt. – plains coreopsis

==== Section Coreopsis ====
- Coreopsis auriculata L. – lobed tickseed
- Coreopsis bakeri E.E.Schill.
- Coreopsis basalis (A.Dietr.) S.F.Blake – goldenmane tickseed
- Coreopsis grandiflora Hogg ex Sweet – large-flowered tickseed
- Coreopsis intermedia Sherff – goldenwave tickseed
- Coreopsis lanceolata L. – lance coreopsis, lance-leaf tickseed
- Coreopsis nuecensis A.Heller – crown tickseed
- Coreopsis nuecensoides E.B.Sm. – Rio Grande tickseed
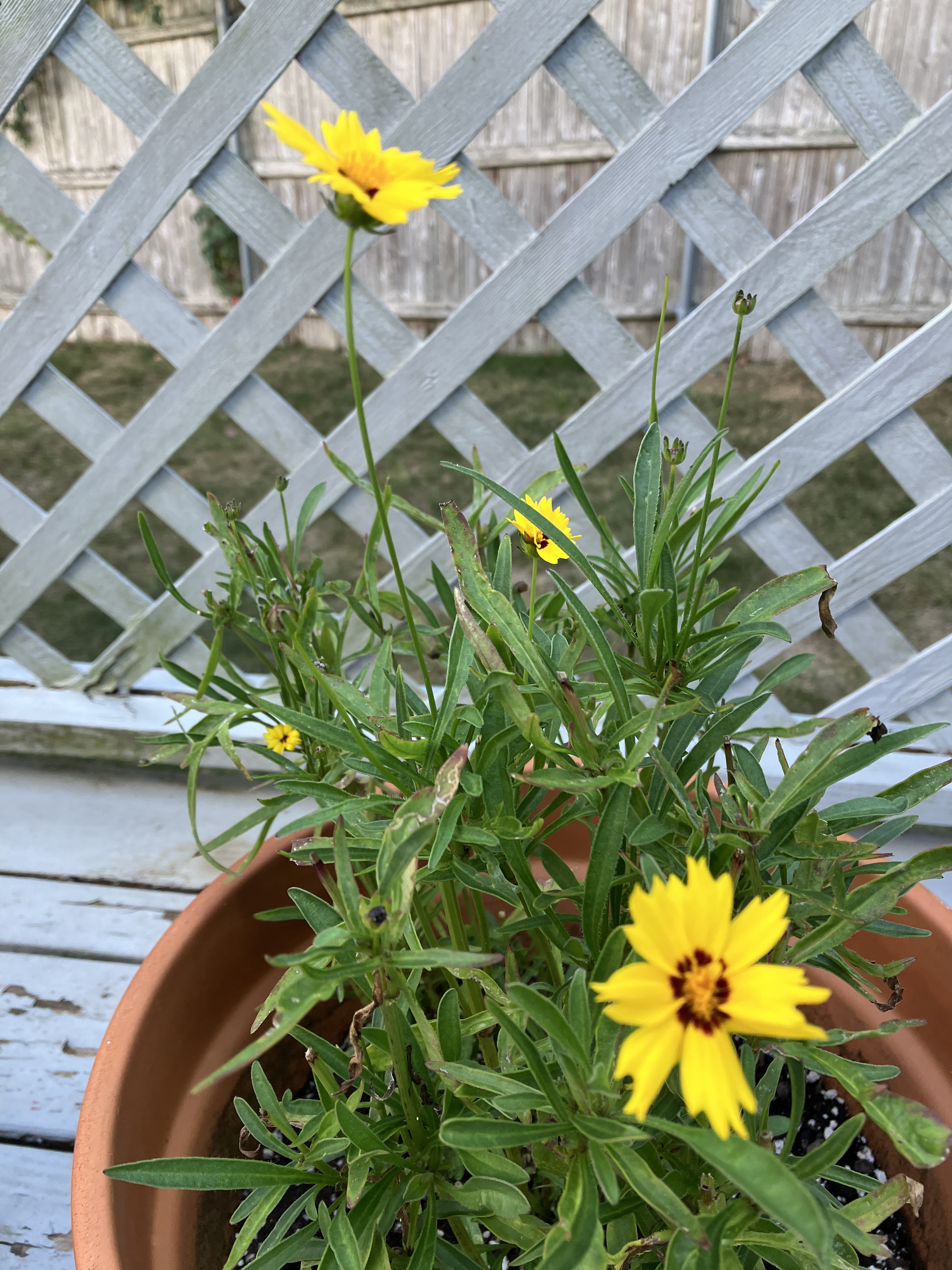
- Coreopsis tinctoria
  Coreopsis pubescens Elliott – star tickseed
- Coreopsis wrightii (A.Gray) H.M.Parker – rock tickseed

==== Section Electra ====
- Coreopsis cuneifolia Greenm.
- Coreopsis mexicana
- Coreopsis mutica DC.

==== Section Eublepharis ====
- Coreopsis floridana E.B.Sm. – Florida tickseed
- Coreopsis gladiata Walter – coastalplain tickseed
- Coreopsis integrifolia Poir. – fringeleaf tickseed
- Coreopsis linifolia Nutt. – Texas tickseed
- Coreopsis nudata Nutt. – Georgia tickseed
- Coreopsis palustris Sorrie – swamp tickseed
- Coreopsis rosea Nutt. – pink tickseed

==== Section Gyrophyllum (syn. Palmatae) ====
- Coreopsis delphiniifolia Lam. – larkspurleaf tickseed
- Coreopsis major Walter – greater tickseed
- Coreopsis palmata Nutt. – stiff tickseed
- Coreopsis pulchra F.E.Boynton – woodland tickseed
- Coreopsis tripteris L. – tall tickseed
- Coreopsis verticillata L. – whorled tickseed

==== Section Leptosyne ====
- Coreopsis douglasii (DC.) H.M.Hall – Douglas's tickseed
- Coreopsis californica (Nutt.) H.Sharsm. – California tickseed
- Coreopsis stillmanii (A.Gray) S.F.Blake – Stillman's tickseed

==== Section Pseudoagarista ====
South America, 35 species

- Coreopsis mcvaughii D.J.Crawford
- Coreopsis petrophila A.Gray
- Coreopsis petrophiloides B.L.Rob. & Greenm.
- Coreopsis spectabilis A.Gray

==== Section Pugiopappus ====
- Coreopsis bigelovii (A.Gray) Voss – Bigelow's tickseed
- Coreopsis calliopsidea (DC.) A.Gray – leafstem tickseed
- Coreopsis hamiltonii (Elmer) H. Sharsm. – Mount Hamilton tickseed

==== Section Silphidium ====
- Coreopsis latifolia Michx. – broadleaf tickseed

==== Section Tuckermannia ====
- Coreopsis gigantea (Kellogg) H.M.Hall – giant coreopsis
- Coreopsis maritima (Nutt.) Hook.f. – sea dahlia

== Distribution and habitat ==
North American Coreopsis can be found in two habitats in the wild, growing along roadsides and open fields throughout the Eastern United States and Canada. In this environment the plant will self-sow.

== Ecology ==
Coreopsis species are a source of nectar and pollen for insects. The species is known to provide food to caterpillars of some Lepidoptera species, including Coleophora acamtopappi.

== Cultivation ==
Coreopsis can grow in a garden as a border plant, or in a container, preferring well-drained soil. Deadheading the flowers ensures it does not become weedy. Using the U.S. Department of Agriculture (USDA) hardiness zones will identify what soil and climate is preferred for different cultivars or species. Notable species found in cultivation are C. grandiflora and C. verticillata, as well as their various cultivars.

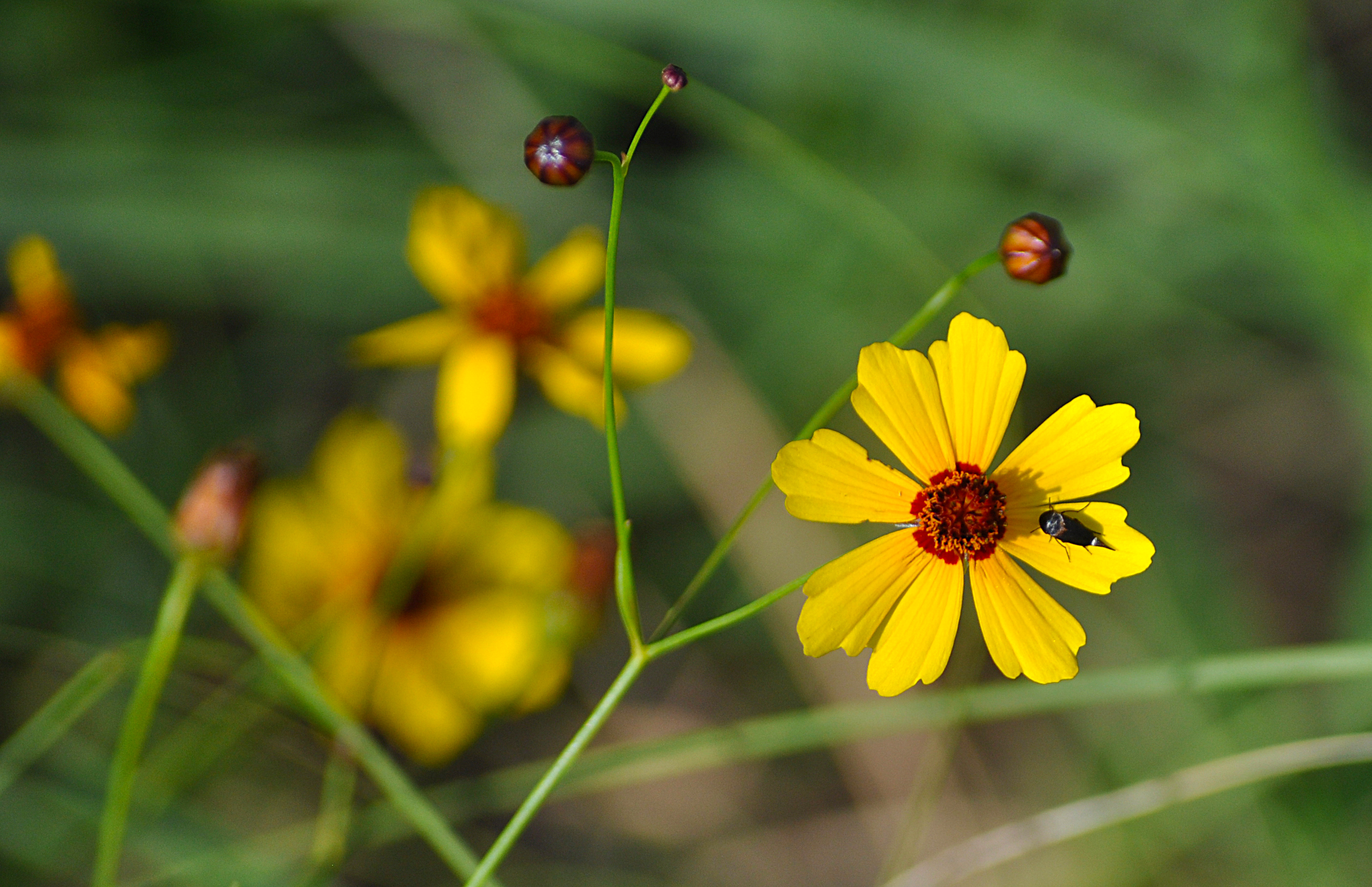
Coreopsis, Kansas wildflower

The sunny, summer-blooming, daisy-like flowers are popularly planted in gardens to attract butterflies. Both annual and perennial types are grown in the home garden (USDA hardiness zone 7a/6b). In the Mid-Atlantic region, insects such as bees, hover flies, and wasps are often observed visiting the flowers.

== Culture ==
All Coreopsis species were designated the state wildflower of the U.S. state of Florida in 1991. In the language of flowers, Coreopsis means to be always cheerful, while Coreopsis arkansa in particular stands for love at first sight.
