= Mouse-ear tickseed =

Mouse-ear tickseed is a common name for several plants and may refer to:

- Coreopsis auriculata
- Coreopsis integrifolia
