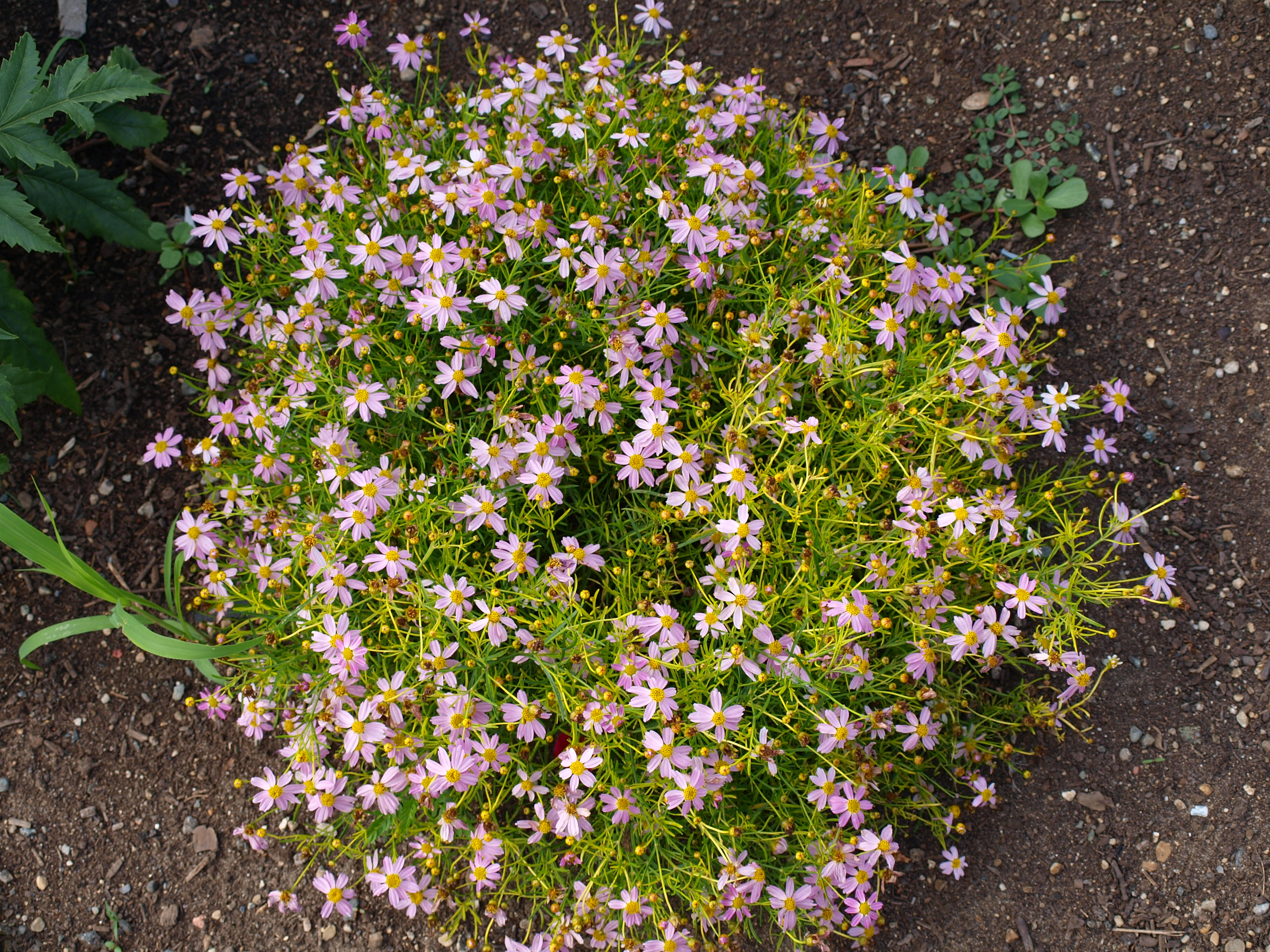

Scientific classification
- Kingdom: Plantae
- Clade: Tracheophytes
- Clade: Angiosperms
- Clade: Eudicots
- Clade: Asterids
- Order: Asterales
- Family: Asteraceae
- Genus: Coreopsis
- Species: C. rosea

Binomial name
- Coreopsis rosea Nutt.

Synonyms
- Calliopsis rosea (Nutt.) Spreng.

= Coreopsis rosea =

Species of flowering plant

Coreopsis rosea, known as the pink tickseed, is a North American species of Coreopsis in the family Asteraceae. It has a discontinuous distribution in the eastern United States and Canada, found in Nova Scotia, Massachusetts, Rhode Island, New York, New Jersey, Pennsylvania, Delaware, Maryland, Georgia, and South Carolina.

Coreopsis rosea grows in wet areas such as marsh edges. Unlike most Coreopsis species, the ray florets are pink or white (instead of yellow). The only other Coreopsis species with pink rays is C. nudata; C. rosea does not seem to be closely related to Coreopsis species which merely have red dots at the base of the rays. Disc florets of Coreopsis rosea are bright or pale yellow.
