= Coreopsis spectabilis =

Scientific classification
- Kingdom: Plantae
- Clade: Tracheophytes
- Clade: Angiosperms
- Clade: Eudicots
- Clade: Asterids
- Order: Asterales
- Family: Asteraceae
- Genus: Coreopsis
- Species: C. spectabilis

Binomial name
- Coreopsis spectabilis A.Gray

Species of plant

Coreopsis spectabilis is a species of tickseed in the Asteraceae family. It is native to Peru.

== Taxonomy ==
Coreopsis spectabilis was first named and described in 1861 by Asa Gray.
