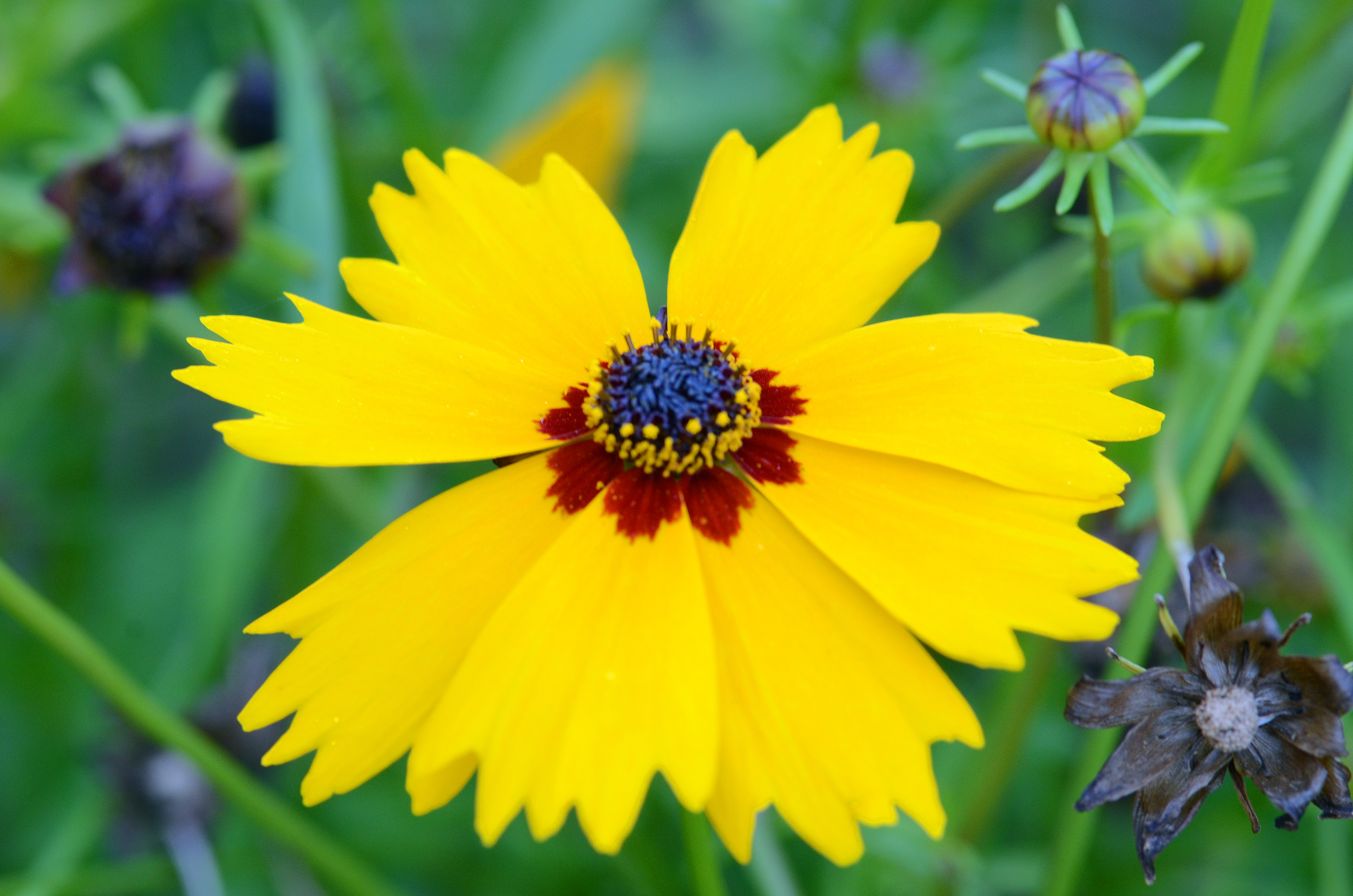

Scientific classification
- Kingdom: Plantae
- Clade: Tracheophytes
- Clade: Angiosperms
- Clade: Eudicots
- Clade: Asterids
- Order: Asterales
- Family: Asteraceae
- Genus: Coreopsis
- Species: C. basalis

Binomial name
- Coreopsis basalis (A.Dietr.) S.F.Blake

Synonyms
- Calliopsis basalis A.Dietr.; Calliopsis diversifolia Huber; Calliopsis drummondii D.Don; Coreopsis basalis var. wrightii (A.Gray) S.F.Blake; Coreopsis diversifolia Hook.; Coreopsis wrightii (A.Gray) H.M.Parker ex E.B.Sm.

= Coreopsis basalis =

Species of flowering plant

Coreopsis basalis, commonly known as the goldenmane tickseed, is a North American plant species in the sunflower family. It is native to the southeastern and south-central United States from Texas to the Carolinas. Isolated populations (apparently escapees from cultivation) have been reported from Connecticut, Illinois, and California.

== Description ==
Coreopsis basalis is a bushy annual up to 60 cm (2 feet) tall with finely cut foliage and showy round flower heads. Plants with internodes 4–7(–10) cm long with both basal and cauline leaves. The foliage is produced on the bottom 3/4–7/8 of plants height. The leaf petioles are 8–35 mm (sometimes over 120 mm) long and the leaf blades are simple (mostly basal leaves) or some with a few pinnate lobes, the cauline leaves are generally cut with rounded lobes, with 3–9+ lobes per leaf. The simple leaf blades (or if lobed, the terminal lobes) elliptic or lanceolate to oblanceolate or linear. The leaf blades are typically 25–55+ mm long and 2–9 mm wide but plants are variable and blade width can range from 1 to 20 mm. Peduncles holding the flower heads 6–15+ cm long. Phyllaries bracts under the flower heads lance-ovate and 7–9+ mm long. The ray florets are 15–20+ mm long and bright yellow with reddish markings near their attachment points to the head. Disc corollas 3–4 mm long and the apices are red-brown to purple. Cypselae or fruits with one seed each produced from fertilized flowers are 1.2–1.8 mm long and wingless but the margins tend to be in-rolled.

Plants grow in sandy soils in open areas, often in disturbed ground. The species range in the eastern part of the USA is increasing as plants are used in landscaping.

== Taxonomy ==
Coreopsis basalis plants from the central Texas to southern Oklahoma area normally have narrower leaf blade lobes and narrower outer phyllaries, these plants have been segregated out as C. wrightii or as C. basalis var. wrightii in the past by some authorities.
