= Tickseed =

Tickseed (also tick-seed and tick seed) is a common name for seeds of several plants that stick to fur, clothing, or other surfaces when the plant is brushed against. The term may refer to any such seed in general, but more specifically to:

- Bidens
- Coreopsis
- Corispermum
- Desmodium
