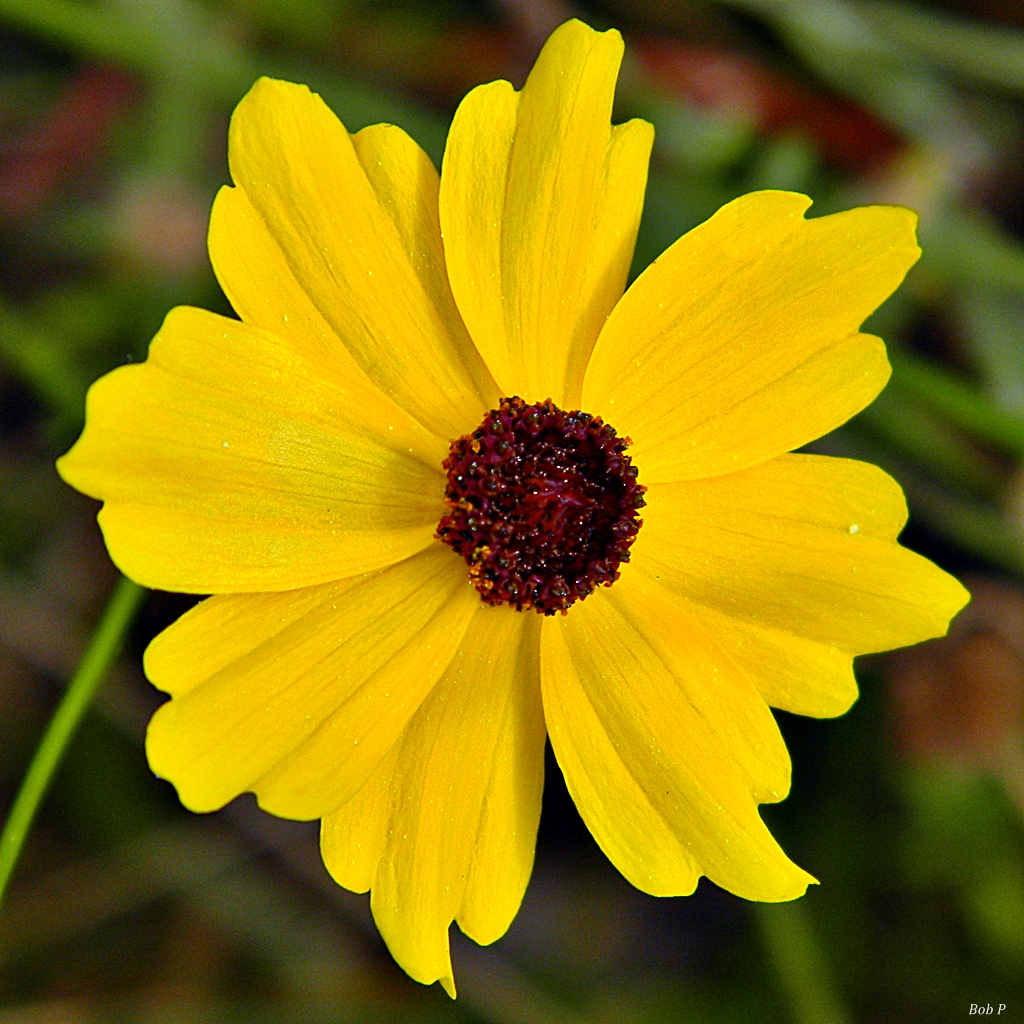

Scientific classification
- Kingdom: Plantae
- Clade: Tracheophytes
- Clade: Angiosperms
- Clade: Eudicots
- Clade: Asterids
- Order: Asterales
- Family: Asteraceae
- Genus: Coreopsis
- Species: C. leavenworthii

Binomial name
- Coreopsis leavenworthii Torrey & A. Gray

Synonyms
- Coreopsis angustata Greene; Coreopsis curtisii Sherff; Coreopsis leavenworthii var. curtissii Sherff; Coreopsis leavenworthii var. garberi A.Gray; Coreopsis leavenworthii var. lewtonii (Small) Sherff; Coreopsis leavenworthii var. typica Sherff. not validly publ.; Coreopsis lewtonii Small

= Coreopsis leavenworthii =

Leavenworth's tickseed

Species of flowering plant

Coreopsis leavenworthii, the Leavenworth's tickseed, is an annual or short lived perennial plant species in the family Asteraceae. It is often grouped within Coreopsis tinctoria which it resembles.

== Description ==
Coreopsis leavenworthii typically grows 30 to 70 cm (12 to 28 in) tall with yellow flower heads that sometimes have reddish-brown blotches at the base of the ray florets. The foliage is 1 or 1.5 pinnately to bipinnately compound with entire edges, and elliptic to oblanceolate to linear.

It blooms year round, mostly in the months of May, June and July.

== Distribution and habitat ==
It is found in the states of Florida and Alabama, and grows in moist, sandy soils, flatwoods or ditches at elevations of 0 to 20 meters from sea level.
