= Coreopsis teotepecensis =

Scientific classification
- Kingdom: Plantae
- Clade: Tracheophytes
- Clade: Angiosperms
- Clade: Eudicots
- Clade: Asterids
- Order: Asterales
- Family: Asteraceae
- Genus: Coreopsis
- Species: C. teotepecensis

Binomial name
- Coreopsis teotepecensis Paray.

Species of flowering plant

Coreopsis teotepecensis is a species of flowering plant in the Asteraceae family. It is native to Guerrero, Mexico. It grows in the "seasonally dry tropical biome".

== Taxonomy ==
Coreopsis teotepecensis was first named and described in 1958 by Ladislao Paray.
