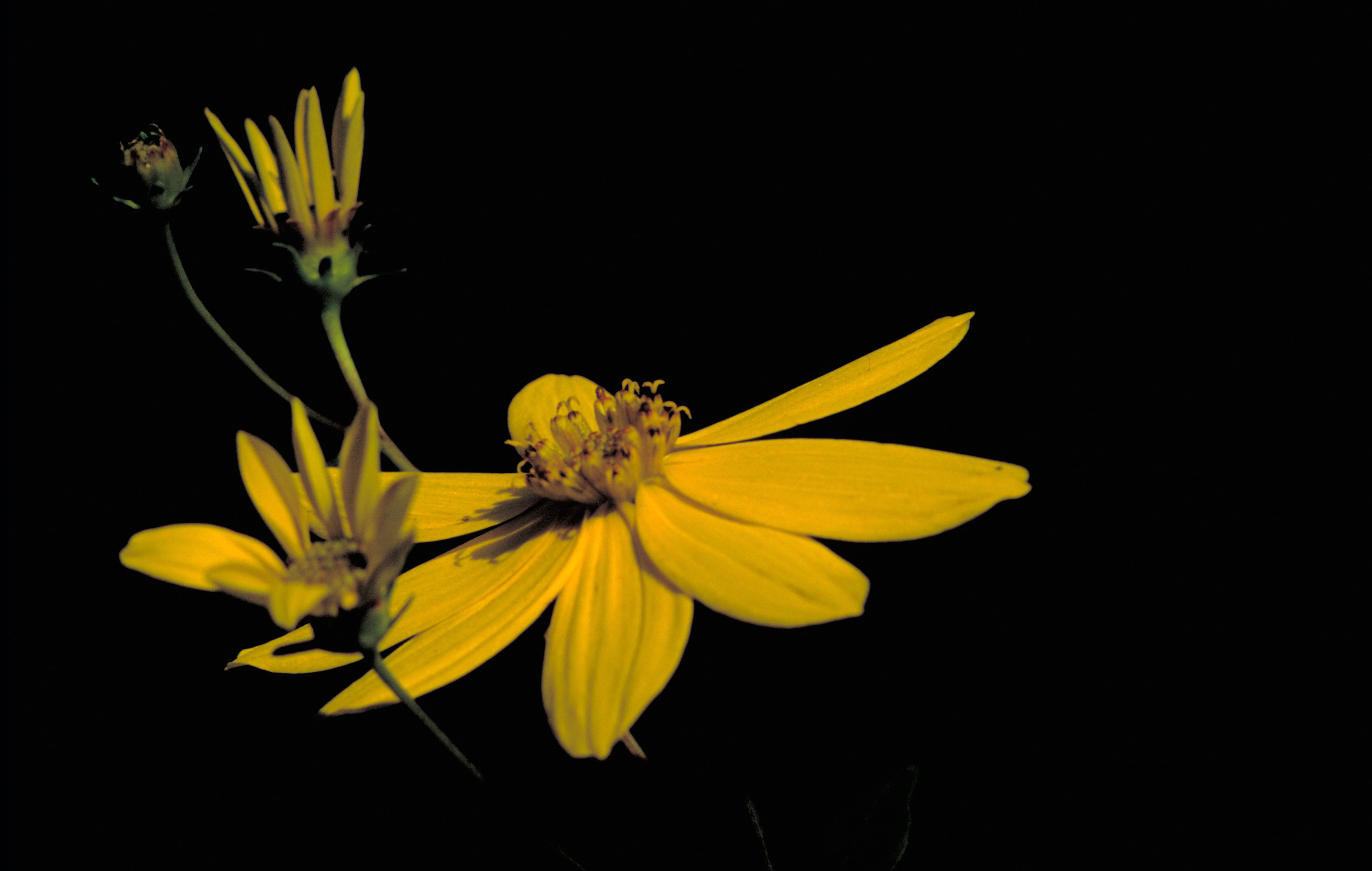

Scientific classification
- Kingdom: Plantae
- Clade: Tracheophytes
- Clade: Angiosperms
- Clade: Eudicots
- Clade: Asterids
- Order: Asterales
- Family: Asteraceae
- Genus: Anacis
- Species: A. major

Binomial name
- Anacis major (Walter) Z.H.Feng, Z.J.Huang & Su Liu

Synonyms
- Chrysostemma senifolium Shuttlew. ex Walp.; Coreopsis major Walter; Coreopsis major f. oemleri (Elliott) Sherff; Coreopsis major var. oemleri (Elliott) Britton; Coreopsis major var. rigida F.E.Boynton; Coreopsis major var. stellata B.L.Rob.; Coreopsis oemleri Elliott; Coreopsis senifolia Michx.; Coreopsis senifolia var. rigida Nutt.; Coreopsis senifolia var. stellata (Nutt.) Torr. & A.Gray; Coreopsis stellata Nutt.; Coreopsis stellata Banks ex DC.; Coreopsis wrayi Nutt.; Gyrophyllum major (Walter) Mesfin & D.J.Crawford; Gyrophyllum major f. oemleri Mesfin & D.J.Crawford

= Anacis major =

Species of flowering plant

Anacis major (synonym Coreopsis major) is a North American species of tickseeds, in the family Asteraceae. It is native to the eastern United States, from Louisiana to Virginia and as far inland as Indiana and Ohio. There are isolated populations in Pennsylvania, Long Island, and Massachusetts, most likely escapes from cultivation.

Anacis major is a perennial herb up to 90 cm (3 feet) tall with yellow flower heads.

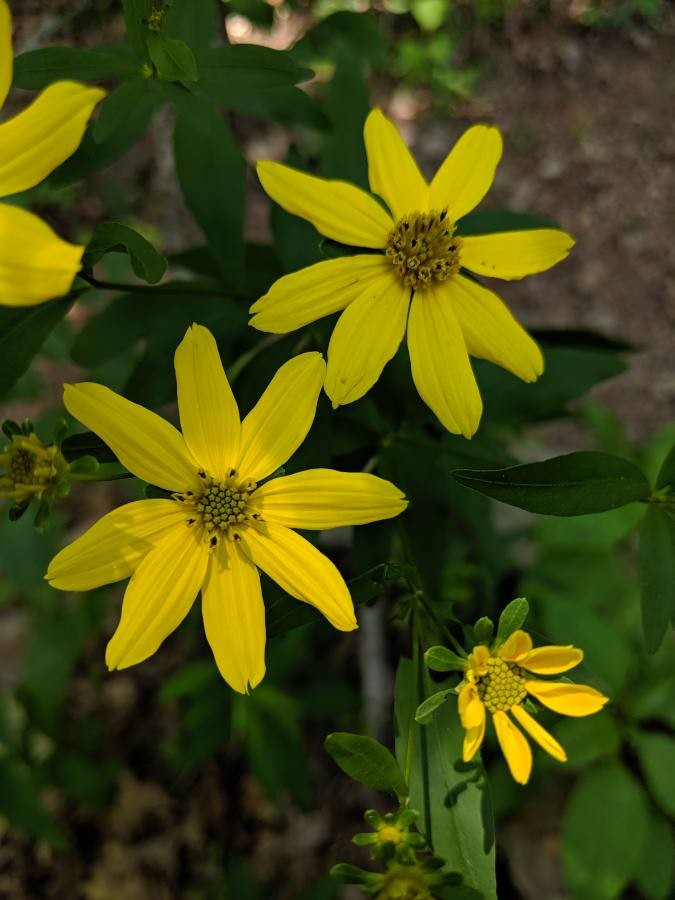
Flowers

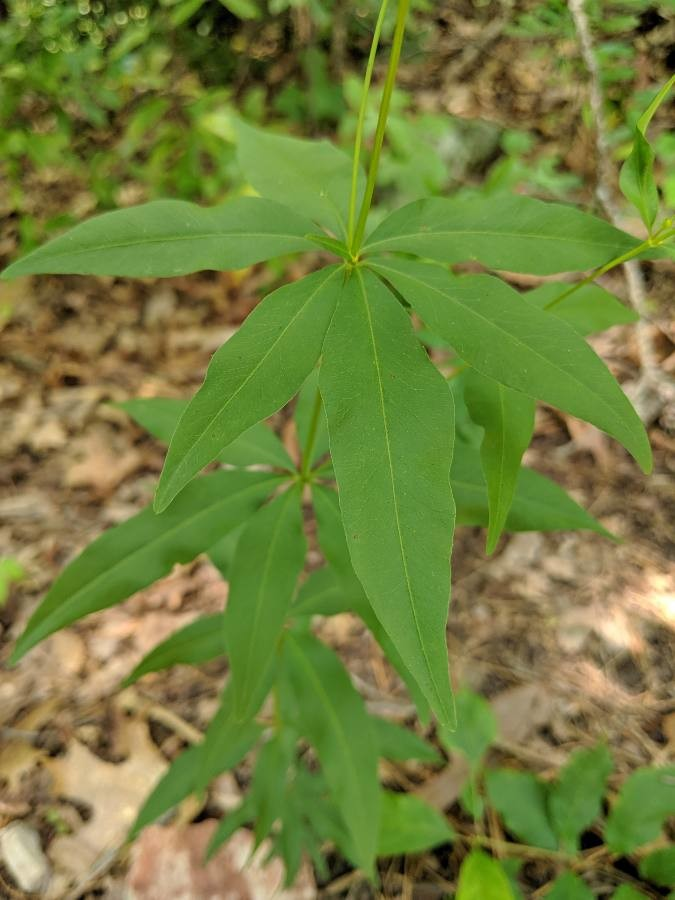
Leaves
