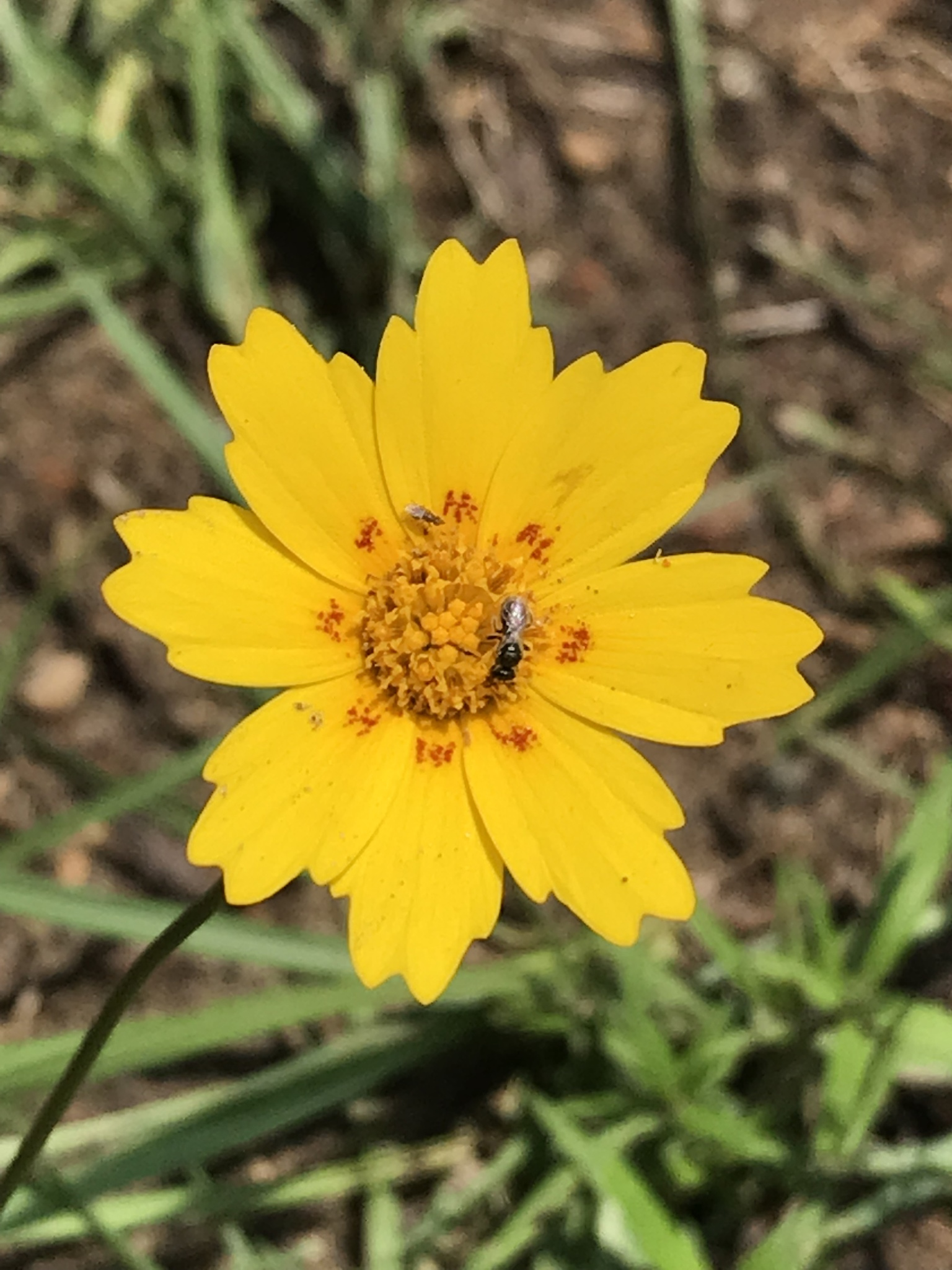

Conservation status
- Apparently Secure (NatureServe)

Scientific classification
- Kingdom: Plantae
- Clade: Tracheophytes
- Clade: Angiosperms
- Clade: Eudicots
- Clade: Asterids
- Order: Asterales
- Family: Asteraceae
- Genus: Coreopsis
- Species: C. nuecensoides

Binomial name
- Coreopsis nuecensoides E.B.Sm.

= Coreopsis nuecensoides =

Species of plant

Coreopsis nuecensoides, commonly known as the Rio Grande tickseed, is a herbaceous, perennial flowering plant in the genus Coreopsis in the family Asteraceae. It is native to southern and southeastern Texas and may also occur in northern Mexico.

== Description ==
Coreopsis nuecensoides is a perennial herb that grows up to 20 inches tall. The ray florets are yellow with red flecks near the base. The leaves are trifoliate. The inner phyllaries are glabrous.

It primarily flowers from March to May, but will sometimes bloom again in the late fall.

== Distribution and habitat ==
Coreopsis nuecensoides is usually found in the coastal areas of southern and southeastern Texas, and may also occur in Tamaulipas, Mexico.

== Taxonomy ==
Coreopsis nuecensoides was first named and described in 1974 by Edwin Burnell Smith.

=== Etymology ===
In English, this species is commonly known as the Rio Grande tickseed.

== Conservation ==
As of December 2024, the conservation group NatureServe listed Coreopsis nuecensoides as Apparently Secure (G4) worldwide. This status was last reviewed on 21 March 2001. In individual states in the United States, it is ranked as Vulnerable (S3) in Texas.

== Image Gallery ==
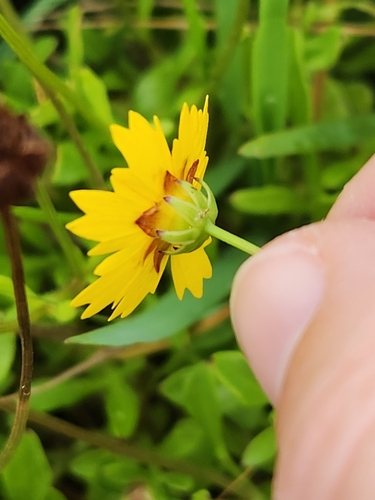
Photo of distinctive glabrous inner phyllaries

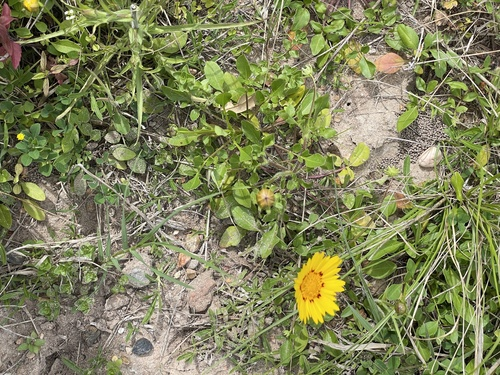
Photo showcasing general growth habit

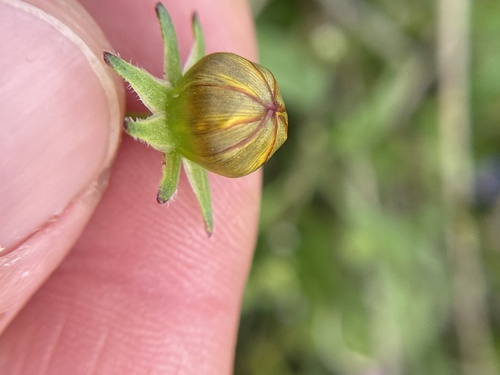
Flower bud of a C. nuecensoides plant

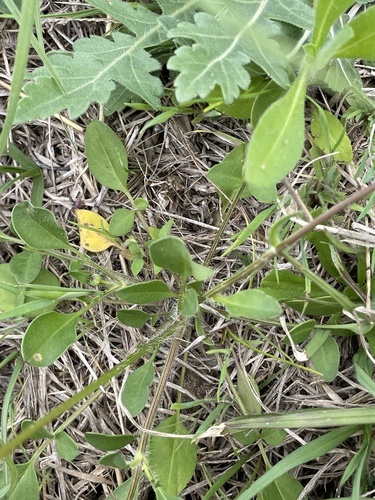
Photo showing the basal leaves
