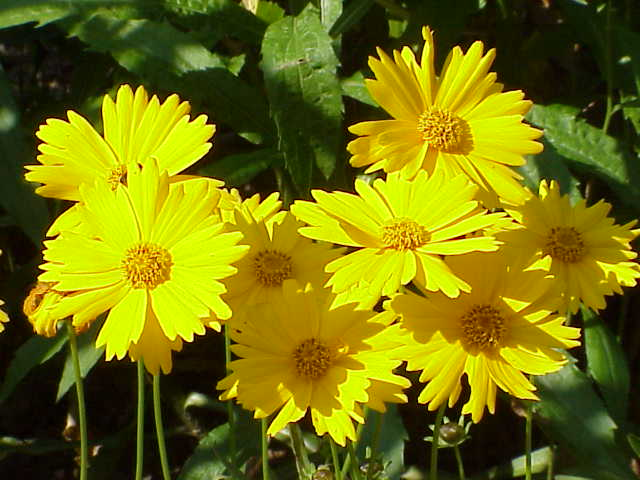

Conservation status
- Secure (NatureServe)

Scientific classification
- Kingdom: Plantae
- Clade: Tracheophytes
- Clade: Angiosperms
- Clade: Eudicots
- Clade: Asterids
- Order: Asterales
- Family: Asteraceae
- Genus: Coreopsis
- Species: C. pubescens

Binomial name
- Coreopsis pubescens Elliott

Synonyms
- Chrysomelea auriculata Tausch; Coreopsis corninsularis Sherff; Coreopsis debilis Sherff

= Coreopsis pubescens =

Species of flowering plant

Coreopsis pubescens, commonly called the star tickseed or common hairy coreopsis, is a perennial, herbaceous, flowering plant in the Asteraceae family. It is found primarily in the central and southeastern United States. There are also reports of disjunct populations in New England and in northern Indiana, probably escapees from cultivation.

== Description ==
Coreopsis pubescens is a perennial herbaceous plant that can grow to 90 cm (3 feet) tall. It primarily flowers from April to September, and typically blooms with both the ray florets and disc florets being completely yellow.

== Distribution and habitat ==
Coreopsis pubescens has been found in the states of Texas, Oklahoma, Kansas, Louisiana, Arkansas, Missouri, Illinois, Indiana, Kentucky, Tennessee, Mississippi, Alabama, Florida, Georgia, South Carolina, North Carolina, Virginia, West Virginia, Connecticut, Massachusetts.

It prefers to grow in sandy soils, granite outcrops, open woods with pine and oak, and disturbed sites such as ditches and roadsides.

== Taxonomy ==
Coreopsis pubescens was first named and described in 1823 in the Sketch Bot. S. Carolina journal by Stephen Elliott.

Plants from coastal Mississippi have been segregated out as Coreopsis debilis or Coreopsis pubescens var. debilis by some authorities.
