= Coleophora acamtopappi =

Scientific classification
- Kingdom: Animalia
- Phylum: Arthropoda
- Class: Insecta
- Order: Lepidoptera
- Family: Coleophoridae
- Genus: Coleophora
- Species: C. acamtopappi

Binomial name
- Coleophora acamtopappi Busck, 1915

Species of moth

Coleophora acamtopappi is a moth of the family Coleophoridae. It is found in North America, including California.

The larvae feed on the seeds of Acamptopappus sphaerocephalus and Coreopsis species. They create a trivalved, tubular silken case.
