= Anacis =

Scientific classification
- Kingdom: Plantae
- Clade: Tracheophytes
- Clade: Angiosperms
- Clade: Eudicots
- Clade: Asterids
- Order: Asterales
- Family: Asteraceae
- Subfamily: Asteroideae
- Tribe: Coreopsideae
- Genus: Anacis; Schrank

Species
- 6; see text

Synonyms
- Chrysostemma Less.; Gyrophyllum (Nutt.) Mesfin & D.J.Crawford

Genus of flowering plants

Anacis is a genus of flowering plants in the family Asteraceae. It includes six species native to eastern North America, that consisted the entirety of Coreopsis sect. Gyrophyllum until 2023, when the genus Gyrophyllum was established for six species distributed largely in the southeastern United States. However, this name was a preexisting synonym of a moss genus, so Anacis was used.

Plants of the World Online accepts the genus Anacis, which other authorities, including the Global Compositae Database, treat as a synonym of Coreopsis as of 2025. Like other current and former species of Coreopsis, plants in the genus carry the common name of tickseed. Several Anacis species are commercially available for use in cultivation as ornamental plants.

== Species ==
Six species are accepted.

- Anacis delphiniifolia (Lam.) Z.H.Feng, Z.J.Huang & Su Liu (formerly Coreopsis delphiniifolia Lam.)
- Anacis major (Walter) Z.H.Feng, Z.J.Huang & Su Liu (formerly Coreopsis major Walter)
- Anacis palmata (Nutt.) Z.H.Feng, Z.J.Huang & Su Liu (formerly Coreopsis palmata Nutt.)
- Anacis pulchra (F.E.Boynton) Z.H.Feng, Z.J.Huang & Su Liu (formerly Coreopsis pulchra F.E.Boynton)
- Anacis tripteris (L.) Schrank (formerly Coreopsis tripteris L.)
- Anacis verticillata (L.) Z.H.Feng, Z.J.Huang & Su Liu (formerly Coreopsis verticillata L.)
