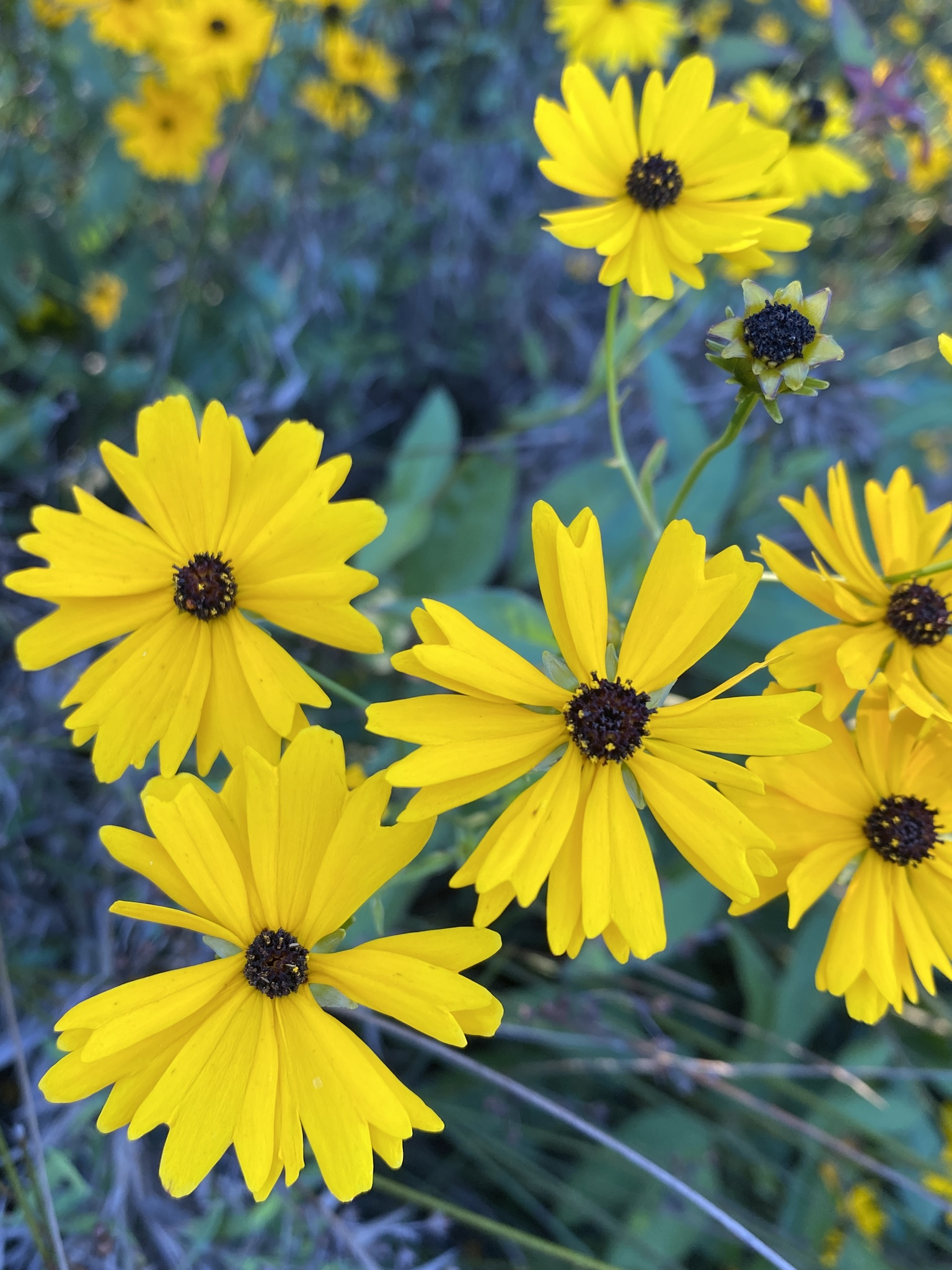

Scientific classification
- Kingdom: Plantae
- Clade: Tracheophytes
- Clade: Angiosperms
- Clade: Eudicots
- Clade: Asterids
- Order: Asterales
- Family: Asteraceae
- Genus: Coreopsis
- Species: C. palustris

Binomial name
- Coreopsis palustris Sorrie

= Coreopsis palustris =

Species of plant

Coreopsis palustris, the swamp tickseed or Beadle's coreopsis, is a species of flowering plant in the family Asteraceae. A perennial reaching 1.2 m (4 ft), it is found in wet areas from southeastern North Carolina to northern Florida. There is a cultivar, 'Summer Sunshine', that is noted for blooming early in the fall.
