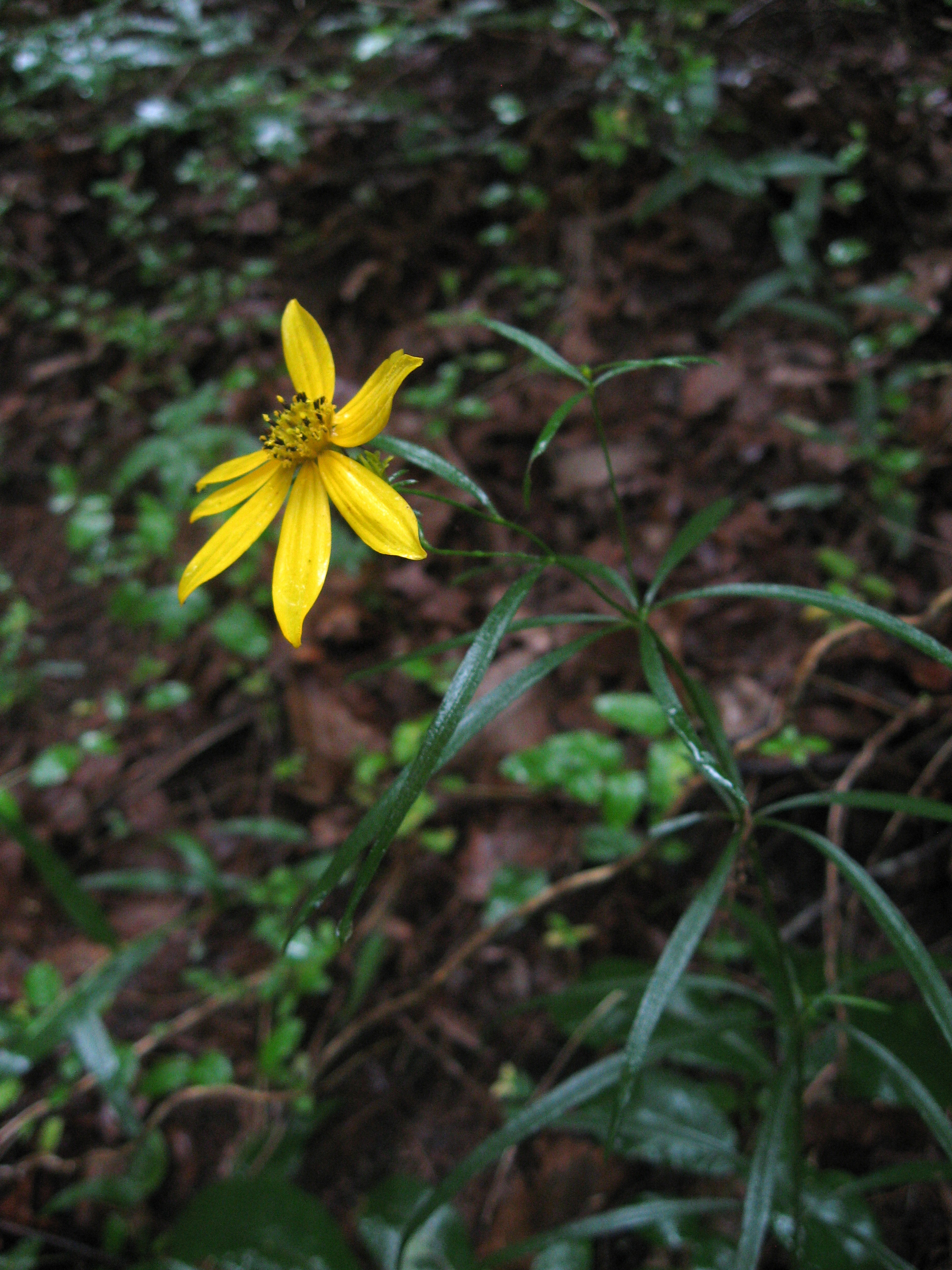

Conservation status
- Vulnerable (NatureServe)

Scientific classification
- Kingdom: Plantae
- Clade: Tracheophytes
- Clade: Angiosperms
- Clade: Eudicots
- Clade: Asterids
- Order: Asterales
- Family: Asteraceae
- Genus: Anacis
- Species: A. delphiniifolia

Binomial name
- Anacis delphiniifolia (Lam.) Z.H.Feng, Z.J.Huang & Su Liu

Synonyms
- Coreopsis delphiniifolia Lam.; Coreopsis delphiniifolia var. chlooidea Sherff; Coreopsis delphiniifolia f. concolor Sherff; Coreopsis delphiniifolia var. linearis (Michx.) Sherff; Coreopsis delphiniifolia var. rigida (Nutt.) Torr. & A.Gray; Coreopsis discolor Link; Coreopsis major var. linearis Small; Coreopsis rigida Nutt.; Coreopsis verticillata var. linearis Michx.; Gyrophyllum delphiniifolium (Lam.) Mesfin & D.J.Crawford

= Anacis delphiniifolia =

Species of flowering plant

Anacis delphiniifolia (synonym Coreopsis delphiniifolia), the larkspurleaf tickseed, is a North American species of perennial tickseeds in the family Asteraceae. It is native to the Southeastern United States, primarily Georgia and the Carolinas with a few outlying populations in Tennessee and Virginia. It is listed as an endangered species in Tennessee.

Anacis delphiniifolia is a perennial herb up to 90 cm (3 feet) tall with yellow flower heads.
