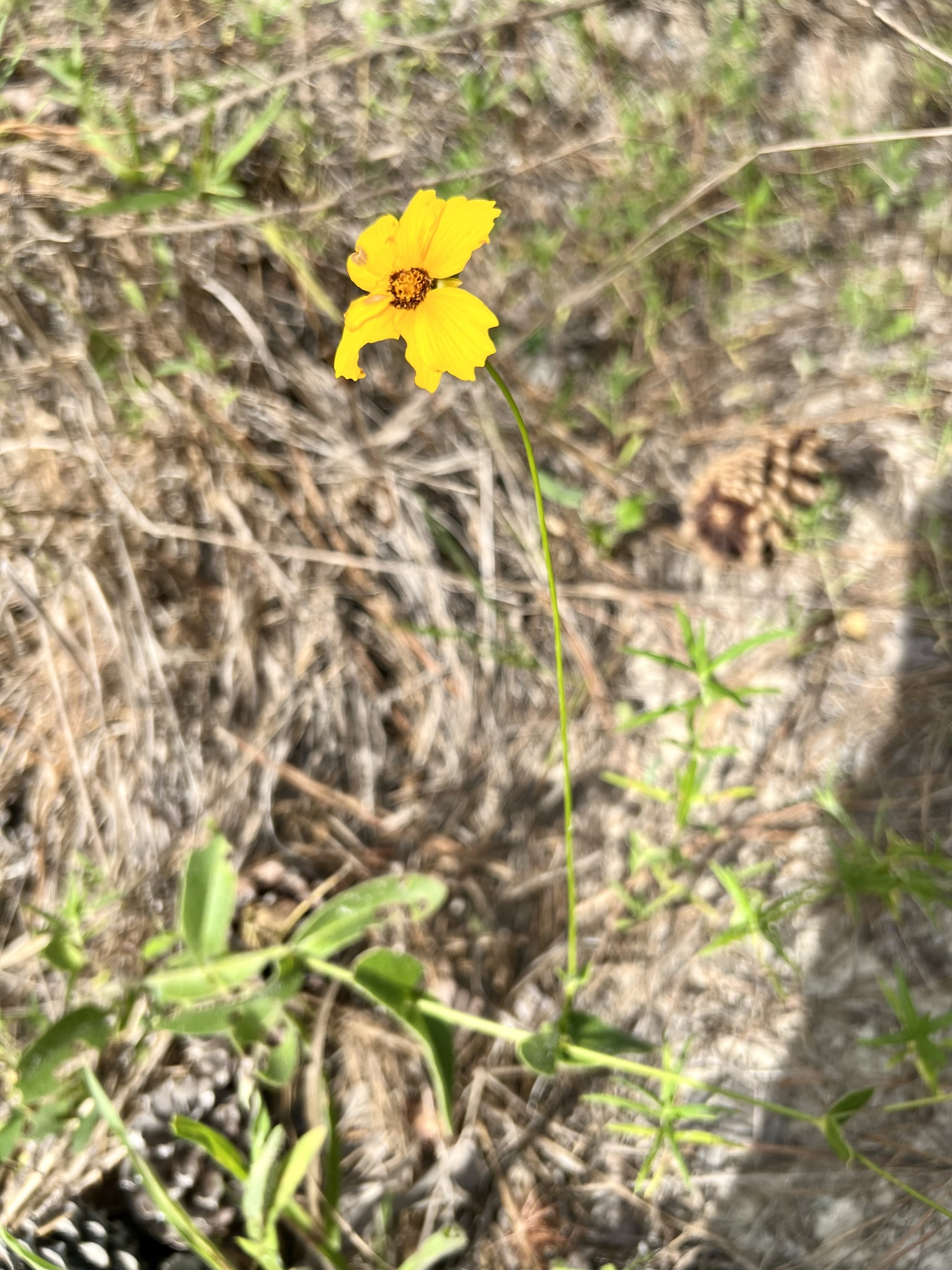

Scientific classification
- Kingdom: Plantae
- Clade: Tracheophytes
- Clade: Angiosperms
- Clade: Eudicots
- Clade: Asterids
- Order: Asterales
- Family: Asteraceae
- Genus: Coreopsis
- Species: C. intermedia

Binomial name
- Coreopsis intermedia Sherff

= Coreopsis intermedia =

Species of flowering plant

Coreopsis intermedia, the goldenwave tickseed, is a North American species of plants in the family Asteraceae. It is native to a small region in the south-central United States (eastern Texas, western Louisiana, southwestern Arkansas.

Coreopsis intermedia is an annual or short-lived perennial up to 90 cm (3 feet) tall, with yellow flower heads containing both ray florets and disc florets.
