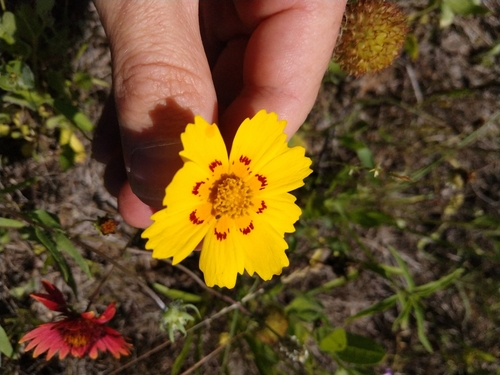

Conservation status
- Apparently Secure (NatureServe)

Scientific classification
- Kingdom: Plantae
- Clade: Tracheophytes
- Clade: Angiosperms
- Clade: Eudicots
- Clade: Asterids
- Order: Asterales
- Family: Asteraceae
- Genus: Coreopsis
- Species: C. nuecensis

Binomial name
- Coreopsis nuecensis A.Heller

Synonyms
- Coreopsis coronata Hook.

= Coreopsis nuecensis =

Species of flowering plant

Coreopsis nuecensis, the crown tickseed, is an annual, herbaceous, flowering plant in the Asteraceae family. It is native to Texas, and probably Tamaulipas. There are reports of isolated populations in Michigan and Florida, both probably escapes from cultivation.

== Description ==
Coreopsis nuecensis is an annual herbaceous flowering plant that typically grows between 10 and 50 cm (3.9 and 19.7 in) tall. Ray florets are yellow with red or purple flecks; disc florets are yellow.

C. nuecensis typically flowers from March to May.

== Distribution and habitat ==
Coreopsis nuecensis is native to Texas and probably Tamaulipas. There are isolated records of this species in Michigan, Florida and Louisiana.

It grows in sandy soils in oak and post-oak woodlands.

== Conservation ==
As of November 2024, NatureServe listed C. nuecensis as Apparently Secure (G4) worldwide with a note that the global status of this species needs to be reviewed. In individual states, it is listed as Vulnerable (G3) in Texas and No Status Rank in Louisiana.
