= Electranthera =

Scientific classification
- Kingdom: Plantae
- Clade: Tracheophytes
- Clade: Angiosperms
- Clade: Eudicots
- Clade: Asterids
- Order: Asterales
- Family: Asteraceae
- Subfamily: Asteroideae
- Tribe: Coreopsideae
- Genus: Electranthera; Mesfin, D.J.Crawford & Pruski

Species
- See text.

Synonyms
- Electra DC., nom. illeg.

Genus of plants

Electranthera is a genus of flowering plant in the family Asteraceae, native to Mexico to Honduras. The genus was first established in 1836, but under the illegitimate name Electra. A replacement name was published in 2015.

== Taxonomy ==
The genus was first described in 1836 by Augustin Pyramus de Candolle, using the name Electra. However, this name had already been published for a plant genus in 1813, so de Candolle's name was illegitimate. In 2014, de Candolle's genus, whose species are shrubby and pistillate-rayed, was resurrected from synonymy with typically herbaceous and sterile-rayed genus Coreopsis. However, at the time the authors did not notice that de Candolle's name was illegitimate. In 2015, the legitimate replacement name Electranthera was published.

=== Species ===
As of March 2024, Plants of the World Online accepted the following species:

- Electranthera cuneifolia (Greenm.) Mesfin, D.J.Crawford & Pruski
- Electranthera mutica (DC.) Mesfin, D.J.Crawford & Pruski
- Electranthera parvifolia (S.F.Blake) Mesfin, D.J.Crawford & Pruski
