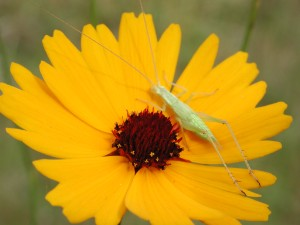

Scientific classification
- Kingdom: Plantae
- Clade: Tracheophytes
- Clade: Angiosperms
- Clade: Eudicots
- Clade: Asterids
- Order: Asterales
- Family: Asteraceae
- Genus: Coreopsis
- Species: C. gladiata

Binomial name
- Coreopsis gladiata Walter

Synonyms
- Synonymy: Campylotheca helianthoides Endl.; Coreopsis angustifolia Dryand. ex Aiton 1789 not L. 1753; Coreopsis callosa Bertol.; Coreopsis dichotoma Michx.; Coreopsis falcata F.E.Boynton; Coreopsis floridana E.B.Sm.; Coreopsis helianthoides Beadle; Coreopsis linifolia Nutt.; Coreopsis longifolia Small; Coreopsis oniscicarpa Fernald; Coreopsis saxicoloidea Sherff

= Coreopsis gladiata =

Species of flowering plant

Coreopsis gladiata, the pool coreopsis or coastalplain tickseed, is a North American species of perennial tickseeds in the family Asteraceae. It is native to the southeastern United States from eastern Texas to southeastern Virginia, primarily to the coastal plain.

Coreopsis gladiata is a perennial herb up to 70 cm (28 inches) tall. Flower heads have yellow ray florets and purple disc florets. The species grows in swamps, bogs, depressions, and pine barrens.
