= Coreopsis paludosa =

Scientific classification
- Kingdom: Plantae
- Clade: Tracheophytes
- Clade: Angiosperms
- Clade: Eudicots
- Clade: Asterids
- Order: Asterales
- Family: Asteraceae
- Genus: Coreopsis
- Species: C. paludosa

Binomial name
- Coreopsis paludosa M.E.Jones

Species of flowering plant

Coreopsis paludosa is an annual or short lived perennial plant species in the sunflower family. It is native to northern Mexico.

Coreopsis paludosa typically grows 30 to 70 cm tall with yellow flower heads. It has elliptic to oblanceolate to linear leaves.
