= Coreopsis petrophila =

Scientific classification
- Kingdom: Plantae
- Clade: Tracheophytes
- Clade: Angiosperms
- Clade: Eudicots
- Clade: Asterids
- Order: Asterales
- Family: Asteraceae
- Genus: Coreopsis
- Species: C. petrophila

Binomial name
- Coreopsis petrophila A.Gray & S.Wats.

Species of flowering plant

Coreopsis petrophila is a Mexican species of flowering plants in the family Asteraceae. It is native to the States of Jalisco, Durango, Nayarit, and Guerrero in western Mexico.

Coreopsis petrophila is a branching subshrub, growing largely on rocky slopes. Leaves are pinnately lobed with narrow lobes. Each major branch has a group of small yellow flower heads, each with both ray florets and disc florets.
