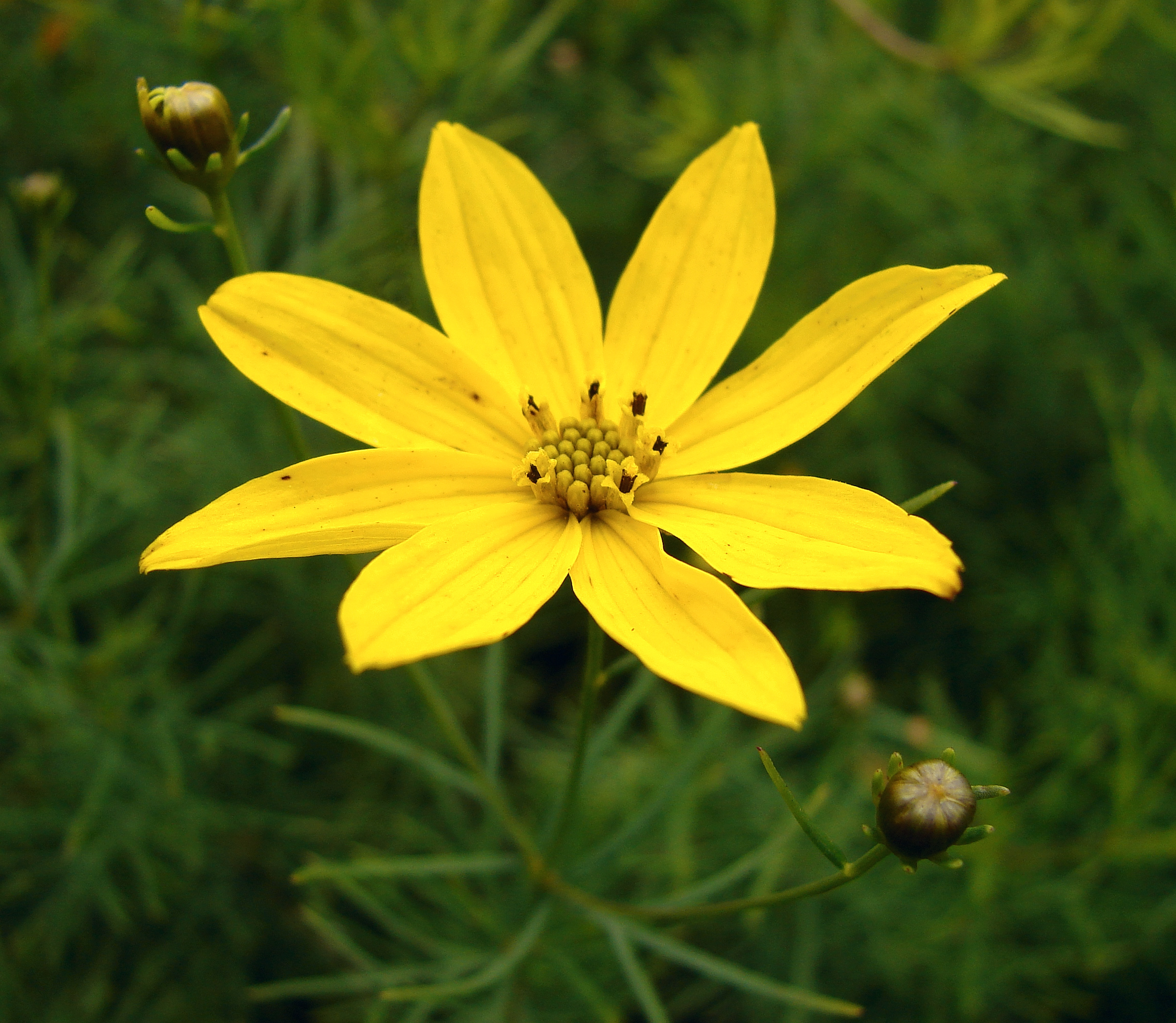

Conservation status
- Secure (NatureServe)

Scientific classification
- Kingdom: Plantae
- Clade: Tracheophytes
- Clade: Angiosperms
- Clade: Eudicots
- Clade: Asterids
- Order: Asterales
- Family: Asteraceae
- Genus: Anacis
- Species: A. verticillata

Binomial name
- Anacis verticillata (L.) Z.H.Feng, Z.J.Huang & Su Liu

Synonyms
- Bidens selenactis Banfi, Galasso & Bartolucci; Bidens verticillata (L.) Baill.; Coreopsis tenuifolia Ehrh.; Coreopsis verticillata L. (1753) (basionym); Coreopsis verticillata var. tenuifolia Michx.; Gyrophyllum verticillatum (L.) Mesfin & D.J.Crawford

= Anacis verticillata =

Species of flowering plant

Anacis verticillata (synonym Coreopsis verticillata) is a North American species of tickseed in the sunflower family. It is found primarily in the east-central United States, from Maryland south to Georgia, with isolated populations as far west as Oklahoma and as far north as Québec and Ontario. The common names are whorled tickseed, whorled coreopsis, thread-leaved tickseed, thread leaf coreopsis, and pot-of-gold.

== Description ==
Anacis verticillata is an herbaceous perennial that grows 2–3 ft (1–1 m) tall and about 2 ft (1 m) wide, although as it spreads laterally by rhizomes, this width can be exceeded. The stems are wiry. The flower heads are up to 2 in (51 mm) across, and both the disc florets and ray florets are bright yellow. The flowers are produced abundantly in clusters from midsummer to fall.

== Habitat ==
Anacis verticillata can commonly be found in dry, thin woods and open pinelands, preferring sites with full sun exposure. It can tolerate drought, poor soil, extreme heat, and neglect.

== Horticultural cultivation ==
Horticultural cultivars of Anacis verticillata are not difficult to grow and hence make good starter plants for beginning gardeners in the U.S. They have a long flowering season and are relatively free from pests and diseases. They attract butterflies and are deer resistant. They can be grown in hanging baskets and containers (where irrigation will be necessary), or as border plants. Carolyn Singer, in "Deer in My Garden", reports that A. verticillata is a good companion plant with other summer-blooming perennials requiring similar conditions. The following notable cultivars have gained the Royal Horticultural Society's Award of Garden Merit:

- 'Grandiflora' - taller than other cultivars, with slightly larger flowers
- 'Moonbeam' - pale, sulphur-yellow flowers, slightly shorter growth, chosen as the 1992 Perennial Plant of the Year by the Perennial Plant Association. When this cultivar was first introduced to the market, demand outstripped supply in some localities, such was its popularity.
- 'Zagreb' - shorter than most Anacis or Coreopsis species, blooms with bright yellow flowers
