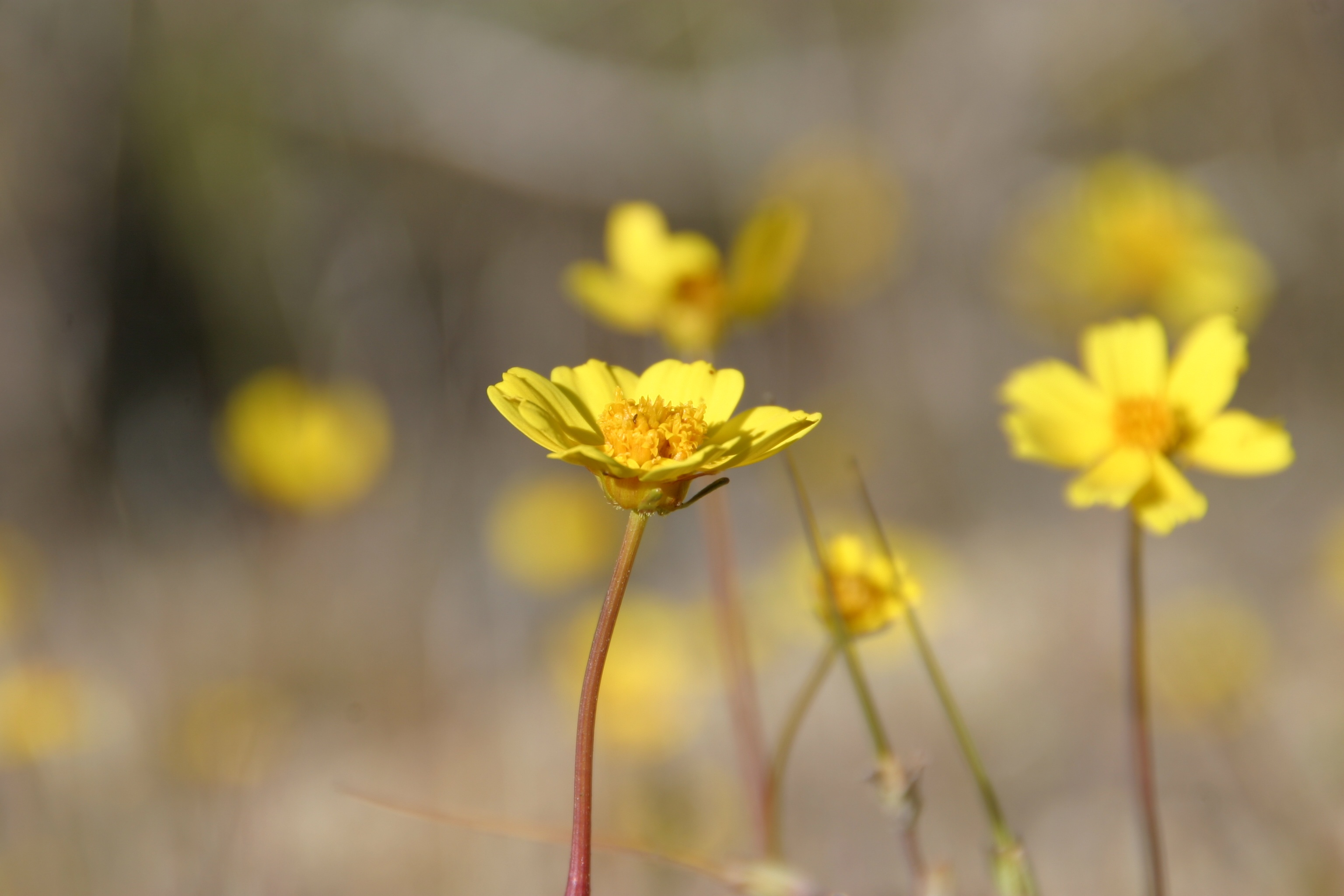

Scientific classification
- Kingdom: Plantae
- Clade: Embryophytes
- Clade: Tracheophytes
- Clade: Spermatophytes
- Clade: Angiosperms
- Clade: Eudicots
- Clade: Asterids
- Order: Asterales
- Family: Asteraceae
- Genus: Leptosyne
- Species: L. californica

Binomial name
- Leptosyne californica Nutt.

Synonyms
- Coreopsis californica (Nutt.) H.Sharsm.; Coreopsis californica subsp. newberryi (A.Gray) A.E.Murray; Coreopsis californica var. newberryi (A.Gray) E.B.Sm.; Leptosyne newberryi A.Gray

= Leptosyne californica =

Species of flowering plant

Leptosyne californica is a North American species of tickseed in the family Asteraceae.

== Description ==
Leptosyne californica is an annual herb up to 30 cm (12 inches) tall. It has linear leaves that are generally basal and 2–10 centimetres (0.79–3.94 in) long. The yellow flower heads have both ray florets and disc florets and appear from March to May.

== Distribution ==
Leptosyne californica is found in dry habitats of California (U.S.) and Baja California state in northwestern (Mexico). It grows at elevations of 30–600 metres (98–1,969 ft). The plant grows in the washes of the San Joaquin Valley, southern Inner California Coast Ranges, and Transverse Ranges; and bajadas of the Mojave Desert, Colorado Desert, and Sonoran Desert.
