= Coreopsis bakeri =

Conservation status
- Critically Imperiled (NatureServe)

Scientific classification
- Kingdom: Plantae
- Clade: Tracheophytes
- Clade: Angiosperms
- Clade: Eudicots
- Clade: Asterids
- Order: Asterales
- Family: Asteraceae
- Genus: Coreopsis
- Species: C. bakeri

Binomial name
- Coreopsis bakeri E.E.Schill.

Species of flowering plant

Coreopsis bakeri, commonly called Baker's tickseed, is a perennial, herbaceous, flowering plant in the Asteraceae family. It is endemic to two counties in northeastern Florida. It is closely related to Coreopsis lanceolata.

== Description ==
Coreopsis bakeri is a perennial herbaceous flowering plant that typically grows between 20 and 35 cm (7.9 and 13.8 in) tall. The linear to narrowly oblanceolate infolded leaves are 11 to 29 cm (4.3 to 11.4 in) long and 0.3 to 1.4 cm wide. The ray florets are yellow with the toothed ligules being between 2 and 2.5 cm long. The five-lobed disk florets are yellow and are between 3.5 and 5 mm long. The outer phyllaries are narrowly ovate, and are 6.5 to 8 mm long by 2.5 to 3 mm wide. The inner phyllaries are ovate and acute, and are 9 to 11 mm long by 3.5 to 4 mm wide.

=== Similar species ===
Coreopsis bakeri is similar to a closely related species named Coreopsis lanceolata. The two species can be differentiated by their leaves; C. bakeri will have unlobed, infolded, linear-oblanceolate glabrous leaves while C. lanceolata will have flat, slightly pubescent, oblanceolate leaves that usually have basal leaf lobes.

== Distribution and habitat ==
There are two known populations of Coreopsis bakeri worldwide. Both are found in northeast Florida. One population occurs in the limestone glades of central Jackson County, while the other occurs in former limestone glades just on the border between Jackson and Gadsden Counties. The populations are separated by about 40 km of floodplain from the Apalachicola River.

== Conservation ==
As of November 2024, NatureServe listed Coreopsis bakeri as Critically Imperiled (G1) globally. This status was last reviewed in October 2021.

Due to Coreopsis bakeri having a severely restricted range (upland limestone glades in Jackson County and possible former glades in Gadsden County), it is threatened by mining, agriculture, development, and hybridization with Coreopsis lanceolata.

== Taxonomy ==
Coreopsis bakeri was first named and described in 2015 by Edward E. Schilling. The species is closely related to Coreopsis lanceolata.

=== Etymology ===
The species epithet bakeri is named in honour of Wilson Baker, who helped discover many of Florida's upland glades and their associated rare species. In English, the species is commonly known as Baker's tickseed, which is also a reference to Wilson Baker.
