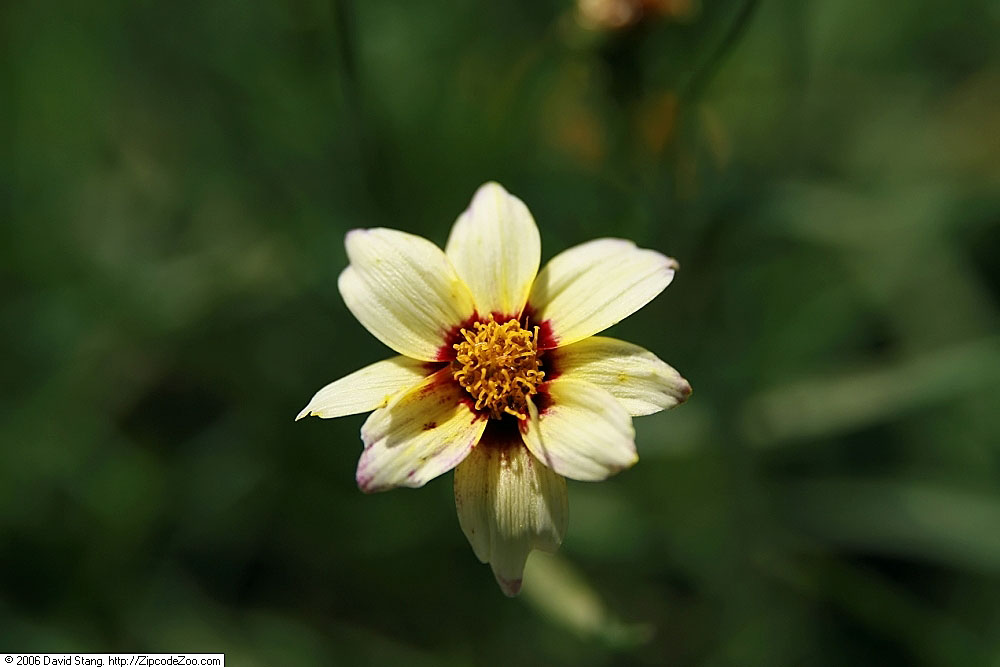

Scientific classification
- Kingdom: Plantae
- Clade: Tracheophytes
- Clade: Angiosperms
- Clade: Eudicots
- Clade: Asterids
- Order: Asterales
- Family: Asteraceae
- Genus: Coreopsis
- Species: C. auriculata

Binomial name
- Coreopsis auriculata L.

Synonyms
- Cymbaecarpa auriculata (L.) Cav.

= Coreopsis auriculata =

Species of flowering plant

Coreopsis auriculata, the lobed tickseed or mouse-ear tickseed, is a North American plant species of the family Asteraceae. It is native to the southeastern and east-central United States, from Louisiana east to the Florida Panhandle and as far north as Kentucky, Maryland, and West Virginia.

== Description ==
Coreopsis auriculata is a perennial growing from 10 to 30 cm (4-12 in) tall and sometimes to 60 cm (24 in). Plants with rounded yellow flower heads bloom in spring and early summer. They are often stoloniferous, forming long spreading colonies by way of short stolons produced after flowering. Plants produce both basal and cauline leaves; the foliage occupy 1/4–1/2 of the plant height, the leaves have petioles 1–6(–10+) cm long, with simple leaf blades or they sometimes have 1 or 2, or more lateral lobes. The basal leaf blades are suborbiculate or ovate-elliptic to lance-ovate and typically 15–55 mm long and 9–25 mm wide. Flower heads are produced on the ends of 8 to 25 cm long peduncles, the heads have 9–12 mm long phyllaries that are lance-deltate to lance-ovate. The ray florets laminae are yellow and 15–20+ mm long. The disc florets have corollas 3.5–4.5 mm long with yellow apices. Flowers bloom April to June. Cypselae or the fruits containing a single seed are 1.5–2.5 mm long and brown black with no wings.

Plants are found growing along roadsides and in openings in woods with mixed hardwood trees and pine barrens especially with calcareous soils in the south eastern USA. Coreopsis auriculata 'Nana' is commonly grown as a blooming ground cover in garden settings.

An orange to red/orange dye produced from the flowers and stems has been used in the past.
