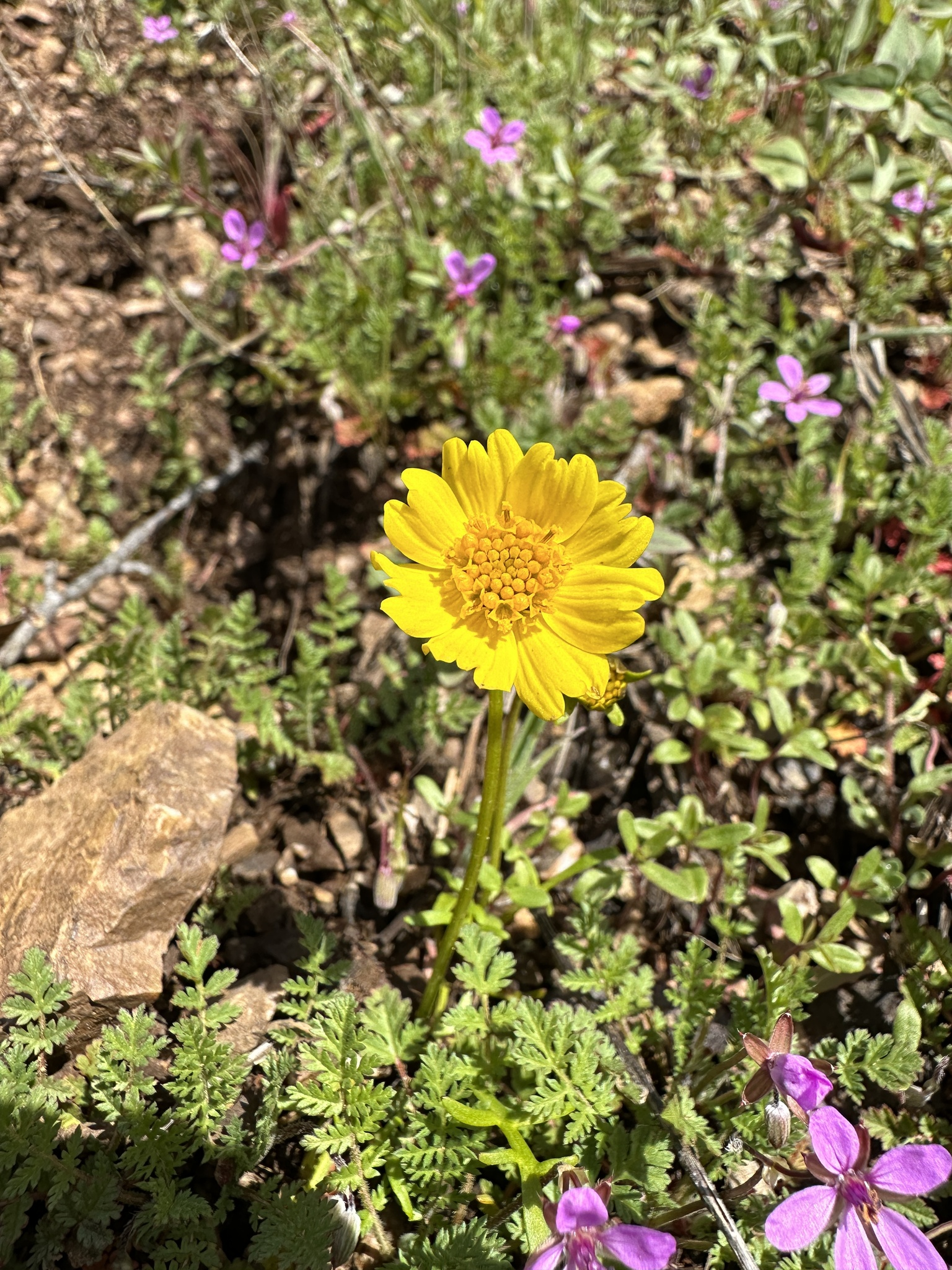

Scientific classification
- Kingdom: Plantae
- Clade: Tracheophytes
- Clade: Angiosperms
- Clade: Eudicots
- Clade: Asterids
- Order: Asterales
- Family: Asteraceae
- Genus: Leptosyne
- Species: L. stillmanii

Binomial name
- Leptosyne stillmanii A. Gray

Synonyms
- Coreopsis stillmanii (A.Gray) S.F.Blake

= Leptosyne stillmanii =

Species of flowering plant

Leptosyne stillmanii is a species of flowering plant in the family Asteraceae known by the common name Stillman's tickseed. It is endemic to California, where it grows in the Central Valley and most of the adjacent coastal and inland mountain ranges in California chaparral and woodlands habitats. It is found east of San Francisco Bay (Contra Costa, Alameda, Santa Clara, Stanislaus Counties) and on the eastern side of the Central Valley (from Placer County to Fresno County).

== Description ==
Leptosyne stillmanii is an annual herb producing one or more erect stems with inflorescences growing to 30 centimeters (12 inches) in maximum height. The lobed, somewhat fleshy leaves are mostly located about the base of the plant and on the lower stem.

The inflorescence includes a solitary flower head with a rounded involucre of green to reddish, rough-textured phyllaries. The flower head has a center of many yellow disc florets and a fringe of 5 to 8 yellow ray florets about a centimeter long on average. The fruit is an achene.
