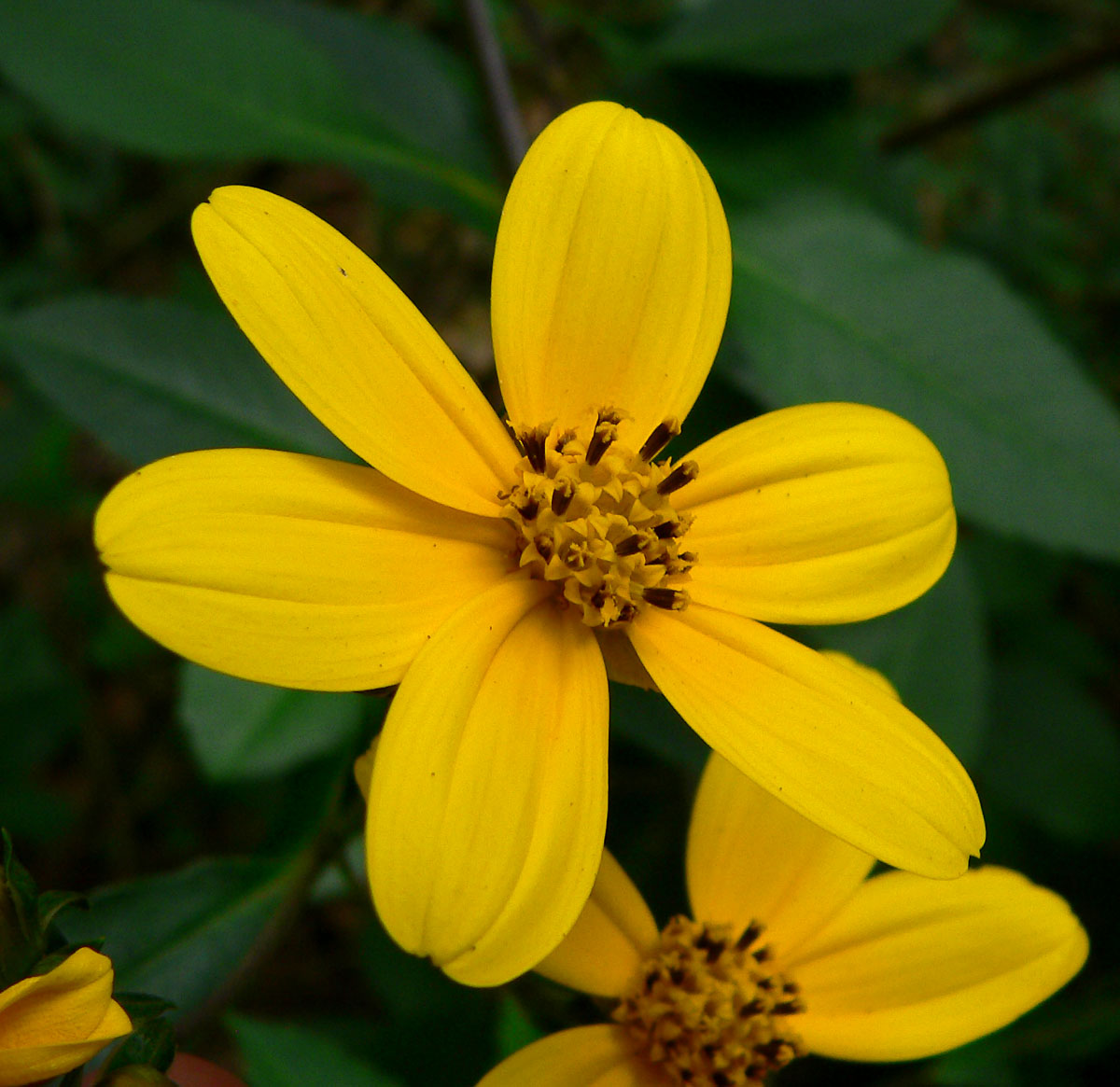

Scientific classification
- Kingdom: Plantae
- Clade: Embryophytes
- Clade: Tracheophytes
- Clade: Spermatophytes
- Clade: Angiosperms
- Clade: Eudicots
- Clade: Asterids
- Order: Asterales
- Family: Asteraceae
- Genus: Electranthera
- Species: E. mutica

Binomial name
- Electranthera mutica (DC.) Mesfin, D.J.Crawford & Pruski

Varieties
- 10; see text

Synonyms
- Coreopsis mutica DC.; Coreopsis mutica var. genuina S.F.Blake; Electra mutica (DC.) Mesfin & D.J.Crawford

= Electranthera mutica =

Species of plant

Electranthera mutica is a species of flowering plant in the family Asteraceae. It is a shrub or small tree, 0.3 to 5 m tall, which is native to the mountains of El Salvador, Guatemala, Honduras, and tropical Mexico.

It grows in montane forests, including oak forests, pine–oak forests, and thickets, and on dry hillsides, roadsides, and along streams from (400) 700 to 2800 meters elevation. It mostly flowers from June to January.

== Varieties ==
Ten varieties are accepted.

- Electranthera mutica var. carnosifolia (D.J.Crawford) Mesfin, D.J.Crawford & Pruski
- Electranthera mutica var. guerreroana (B.L.Turner) Mesfin, D.J.Crawford & Pruski
- Electranthera mutica var. holotricha (S.F.Blake) Mesfin, D.J.Crawford & Pruski
- Electranthera mutica var. leptomera (Sherff) Mesfin, D.J.Crawford & Pruski
- Electranthera mutica var. mexicana (DC.) Mesfin, D.J.Crawford & Pruski (synonyms Electra mexicana DC. and Coreopsis mexicana Hemsl.)
- Electranthera mutica var. miahuatlana (B.L.Turner) Mesfin, D.J.Crawford & Pruski
- Electranthera mutica var. microcephala (D.J.Crawford) Mesfin, D.J.Crawford & Pruski
- Electranthera mutica var. multiligulata (D.J.Crawford) Mesfin, D.J.Crawford & Pruski
- Electranthera mutica var. mutica
- Electranthera mutica var. subvillosa (DC.) Mesfin, D.J.Crawford & Pruski
