= Electranthera cuneifolia =

Scientific classification
- Kingdom: Plantae
- Clade: Tracheophytes
- Clade: Angiosperms
- Clade: Eudicots
- Clade: Asterids
- Order: Asterales
- Family: Asteraceae
- Genus: Electranthera
- Species: E. cuneifolia

Binomial name
- Electranthera cuneifolia (Greenm.) Mesfin, D.J.Crawford & Pruski (2015)

Synonyms
- Coreopsis cuneifolia Greenm. (1904); Electra cuneifolia (Greenm.) Mesfin & D.J.Crawford (2013)

Species of plant

Electranthera cuneifolia is a shrubby flowering plant native to the states of Durango, Nayarit, and Jalisco in west-central Mexico. It grows in oak forests in the southern Sierra Madre Occidental from 1500 to 1800 meters elevation.

The species was first described as Coreopsis cuneifolia by Jesse More Greenman in 1904. In 2013 Daniel J. Crawford and Mesfin Tadesse found three Coreopsis species distinct from the rest of the genus, and placed them in the revived genus Electra named by Augustin Pyramus de Candolle in 1836. That genus name is illegitimate, and the genus Electranthera was named in 2015.
