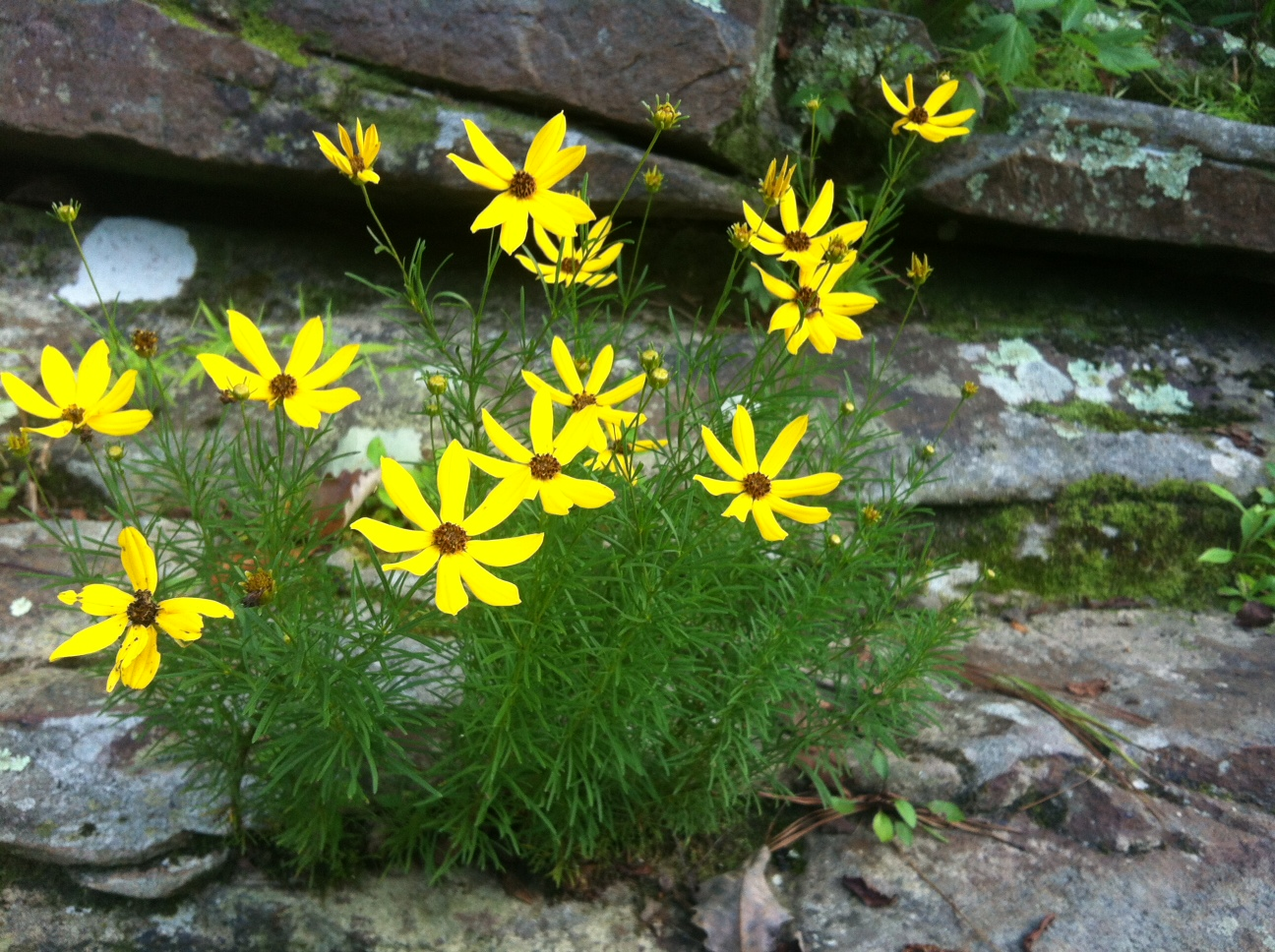

Conservation status
- Imperiled (NatureServe)

Scientific classification
- Kingdom: Plantae
- Clade: Tracheophytes
- Clade: Angiosperms
- Clade: Eudicots
- Clade: Asterids
- Order: Asterales
- Family: Asteraceae
- Genus: Anacis
- Species: A. pulchra

Binomial name
- Anacis pulchra (F.E.Boynton) Z.H.Feng, Z.J.Huang & Su Liu

Synonyms
- Coreopsis pulchra F.E.Boynton; Gyrophyllum pulchrum (F.E.Boynton) Mesfin & D.J.Crawford

= Anacis pulchra =

Species of flowering plant

Anacis pulchra is a North American wildflower native to the Southeastern United States, belonging to the family Asteraceae. It is commonly known as Lookout Mountain Tickseed, Sandstone Tickseed, Woodland Tickseed, Showy Tickseed, and Beautiful Tickseed. Anacis pulchra is native to the Cumberland Plateau of northeast Alabama and grows on sandstone outcrops and around rocky streams. There are also unsubstantiated reports of Anacis Pulchra growing in neighboring Georgia. Due to its limited geographical range and specific growing conditions, Anacis Pulchra is considered imperiled.

== Description ==
Anacis pulchra is a herbaceous perennial shrub that grows about 2 feet tall (or 60 cm). Blooming June through September, it has yellow or gold flowers with a dark center and bears cypsela fruit (the fruit has also been called an achene, but this is technically incorrect). The flowers are typically between 20-40 cm and can dry a purple or black color. The leaves are small (about 1mm) and are simple trifoliate blades.

== Etymology ==
The species name pulchra comes from the Latin word pulcher, which means pretty.

The plant was first scientifically described by the self-taught American botanist Frank Ellis Boynton (F.E. Boynton) in 1903, originally named Coreopsis pulchra. The currently recognized common names include Lookout Mountain Tickseed; Sandstone Tickseed; Woodland Tickseed; Showy Tickseed; Beautiful Tickseed. The most widely used scientific name is Anacis pulchra, but synonyms include Coreopsis pulchra and Gyrophyllum pulchrum based on genetic sequencing and examinations of rules for proper botanical nomenclature.

The reason there is such debate between calling the flower Coreopsis or Anacis is that it is undecided whether or not the plant has a perennial life cycle or an annual life cycle. Flowers that belong to the genus Anacis have perennial life cycles where as those belonging to the genus Coreopsis have annual life cycles. However, there have been some cases in which Coreopsis plants have had perennial life cycles, hence why there is so much debate.

== Habitat ==
Anacis pulchra is endemic to northeast Alabama. There are some claims of reach into adjacent northwestern Georgia; however, strong evidence has not yet been provided for this idea. Classified as sparse in density and restricted in habitat under Rabinowitz's (1981) system, Anasis pulchra exists infrequently in outcroppings around the Little River Canyon.

Anacis pulchra is mainly found in very shallow pockets of sandstone(less than 5cm deep) filled with inwash soil and occasionally on coarse soil in and around the Little River Canyon. This plant is found at elevations around 300 meters and typically grows in direct sunlight, where it experiences a wide range of temperatures and moisture levels, including seasonal dryness.

== Conservation ==
Due to narrow habitat requirements and small geographic range, this species is considered G2 imperiled under the NatureServe status rating system. Anacis pulchra's endangerment is thought to be lessened due to existing primarily in the confines of a state park; however, logging has been cited as a potential threat to its population size.
