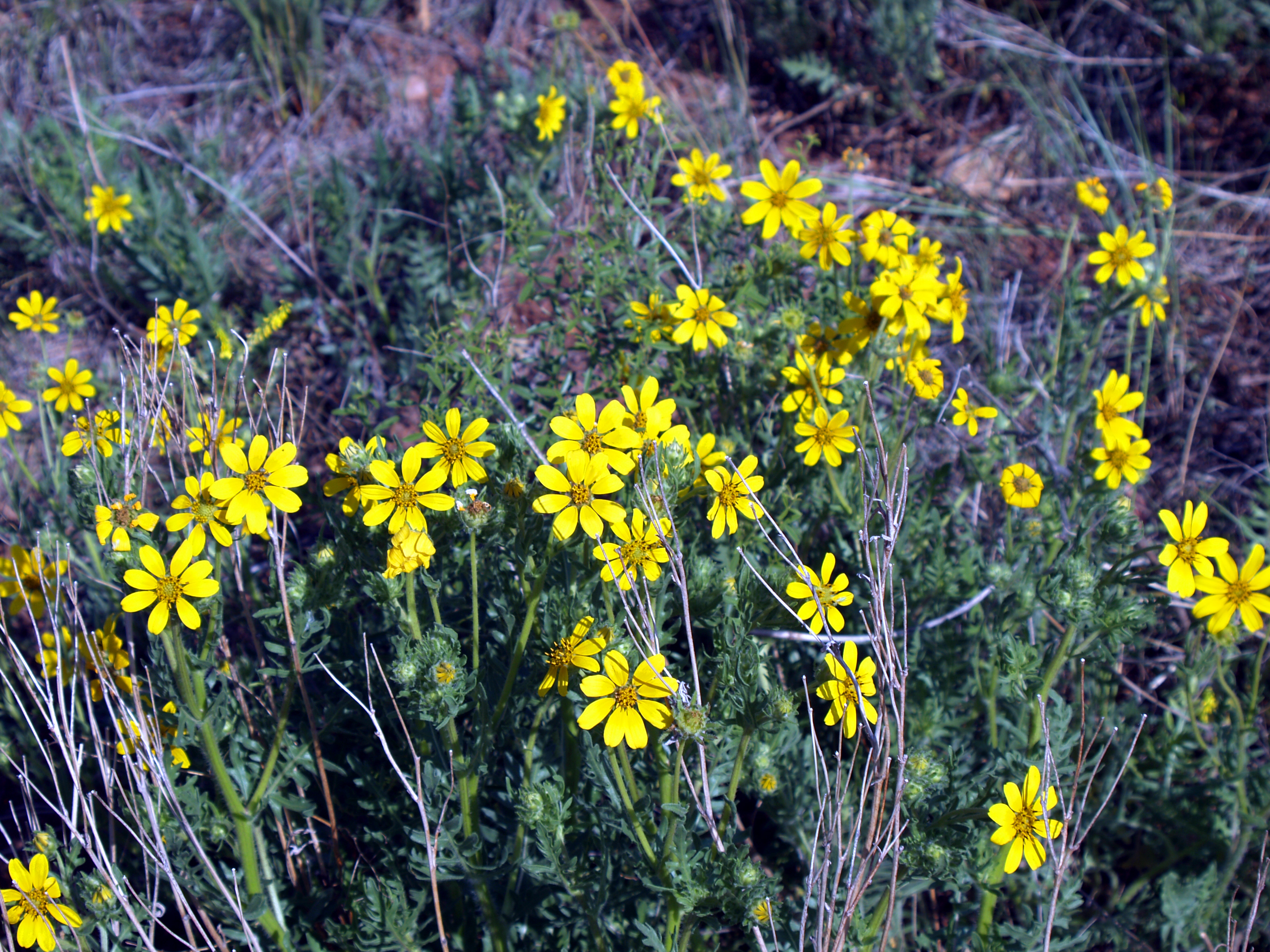

Conservation status
- Secure (NatureServe)

Scientific classification
- Kingdom: Plantae
- Clade: Tracheophytes
- Clade: Angiosperms
- Clade: Eudicots
- Clade: Asterids
- Order: Asterales
- Family: Asteraceae
- Genus: Anacis
- Species: A. palmata

Binomial name
- Anacis palmata (Nutt.) Z.H.Feng, Z.J.Huang & Su Liu

Synonyms
- Calliopsis palmata (Nutt.) Spreng.; Coreopsis palmata Nutt.; Coreopsis pauciflora Lehm.; Coreopsis praecox Fresen.; Gyrophyllum palmatum (Nutt.) Mesfin & D.J.Crawford

= Anacis palmata =

Species of flowering plant

Anacis palmata (synonym Coreopsis palmata) is a North American species of flowering plant in the family Asteraceae native to North America. Common names include stiff tickseed, wedgeleaf coreopsis, prairie coreopsis, prairie tickseed, and finger coreopsis.

== Description ==
Anacis palmata is a perennial herb reaching about 80 centimeters (32 inches) in height. The leaf blades are often lobed, but are not divided into leaflets as in some related species. The flower heads contain ray florets up to 2.5 centimeters long, or sometimes longer. They are yellow, and generally a paler shade of yellow than related native Coreopsis. The center of the head has many disc florets that bloom yellow and darken as they dry. The plants flower in summer and the herbage may age red in the fall.

== Distribution and habitat ==
It is native to the central United States and central Canada, mostly the Mississippi Valley and adjacent areas from Louisiana north to Manitoba and east into southwestern Michigan. The native habitat of this species includes woods, disturbed prairies, roadsides, rocky ridges, and prairie.
