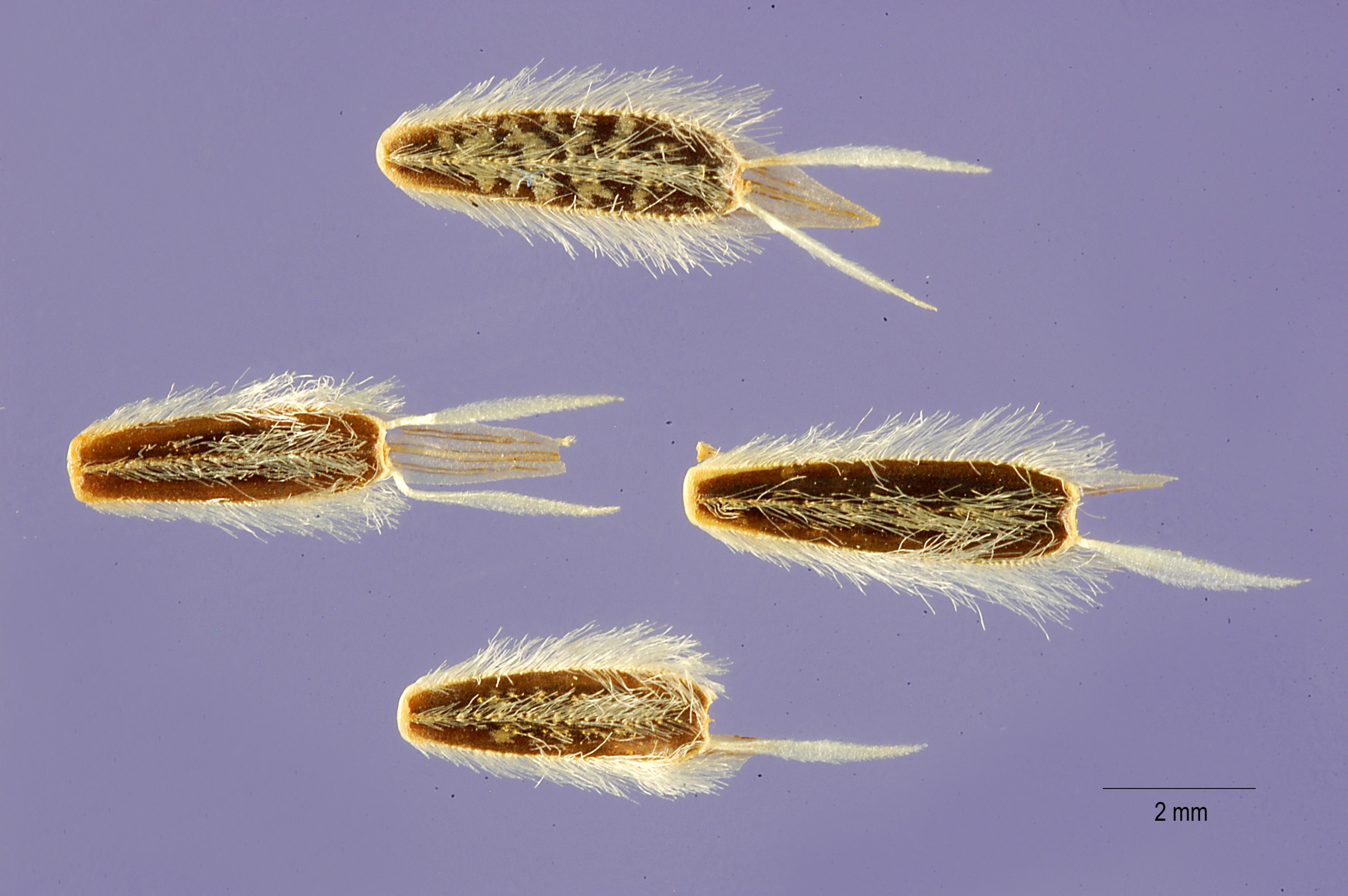
- Achenes

Scientific classification
- Kingdom: Plantae
- Clade: Tracheophytes
- Clade: Angiosperms
- Clade: Eudicots
- Clade: Asterids
- Order: Asterales
- Family: Asteraceae
- Genus: Leptosyne
- Species: L. douglasii

Binomial name
- Leptosyne douglasii DC.

Synonyms
- Coreopsis douglasii (DC.) H.M.Hall; Coreopsis stillmanii var. jonesii Sherff

= Leptosyne douglasii =

Species of flowering plant

Leptosyne douglasii is a species of flowering plant in the family Asteraceae known by the common name Douglas' tickseed. It is native to California from Santa Clara County to San Diego County, as well as from Mohave County in Arizona.

The plant grows on the slopes of the Transverse Ranges, and the Inner South California Coast Ranges adjacent to the western edge of the Central Valley—San Joaquin Valley.

== Description ==
Leptosyne douglasii is an annual herb producing one or more stems with erect inflorescences growing up to about 25 centimeters tall. The slightly fleshy leaves are located mainly around the base of the stem. They are up to 8 centimeters long and linear in shape or divided into linear lobes.

The inflorescence bears a single flower head with a rounded involucre of lance-shaped, pointed phyllaries. The head has a center of many small yellow disc florets and a fringe of 5 to 8 bright yellow ray florets each usually under a centimeter long. The fruit is an achene.
