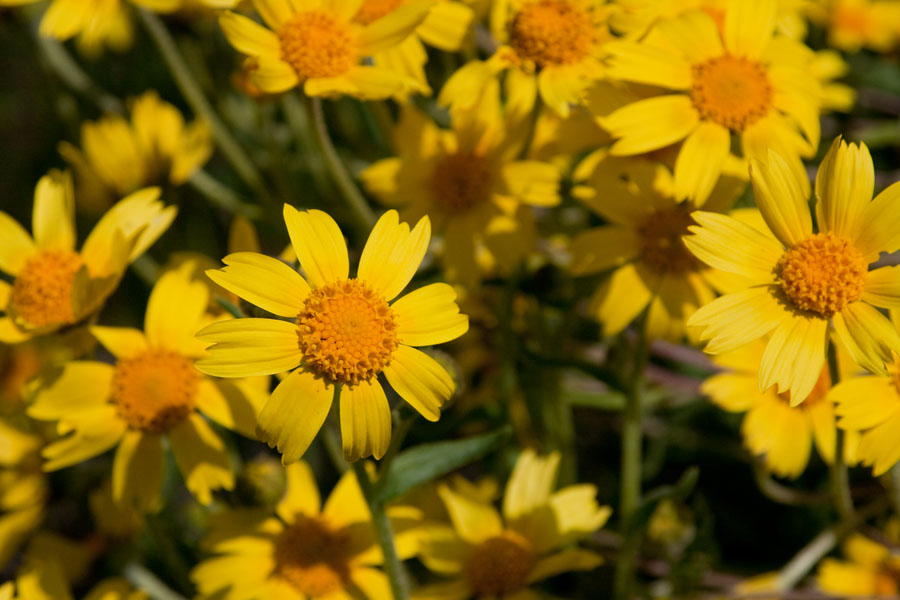

Scientific classification
- Kingdom: Plantae
- Clade: Tracheophytes
- Clade: Angiosperms
- Clade: Eudicots
- Clade: Asterids
- Order: Asterales
- Family: Asteraceae
- Genus: Leptosyne
- Species: L. calliopsidea

Binomial name
- Leptosyne calliopsidea (DC.) A.Gray

Synonyms
- Agarista calliopsidea DC.; Coreopsis calliopsidea (DC.) A.Gray; Leptosyne calliopsidea var. nana A.Gray; Pugiopappus calliopsideus (DC.) A.Gray

= Leptosyne calliopsidea =

Species of flowering plant

Leptosyne calliopsidea is a species of flowering plant in the daisy family known by the common name leafstem tickseed. It is endemic to California. The plant grows in some of the southern coastal mountain ranges and Transverse Ranges and the Mojave Desert from Alameda and Inyo Counties south to Riverside County.

== Description ==
Leptosyne calliopsidea is an annual herb producing one or more stems growing up to about 40 centimeters (16 inches) tall, or sometimes taller. The slightly fleshy leaves are located mainly around the base of the stem, each divided into several narrow lobes.

The inflorescence consists of a single flower head with a bell-shaped involucre of triangular phyllaries. The head has a center of up to 50 tiny yellow disc florets and a fringe of usually 8 bright yellow ray florets each up to 3.5 centimeters (1.4 inches) long.

The fruit is an achene. The fruit of the ray floret is oval and hairless and lacks a pappus; that of the disc floret is more slender, shiny, lined with hairs, and tipped with a pappus of scales.
