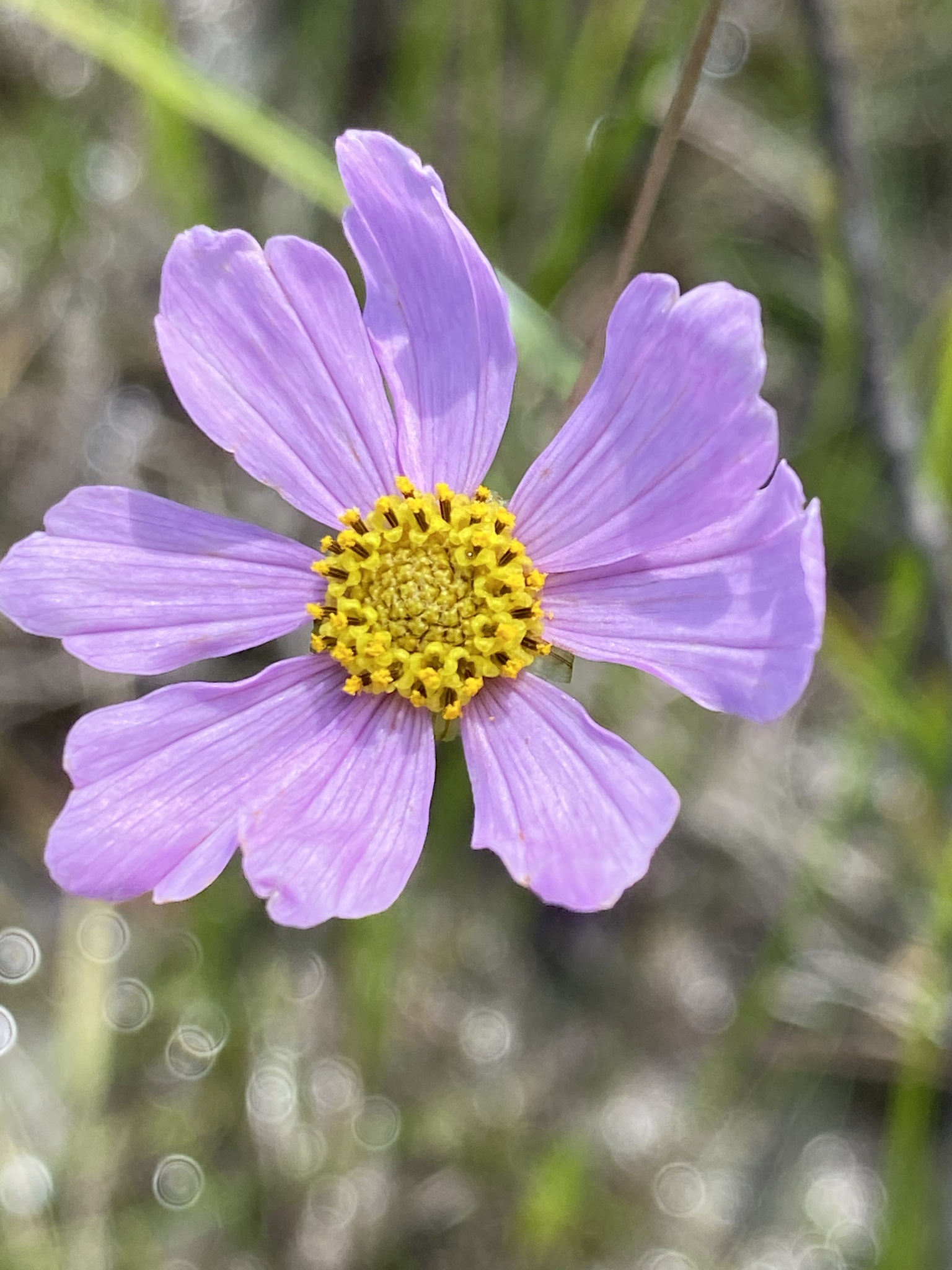

Scientific classification
- Kingdom: Plantae
- Clade: Tracheophytes
- Clade: Angiosperms
- Clade: Eudicots
- Clade: Asterids
- Order: Asterales
- Family: Asteraceae
- Genus: Coreopsis
- Species: C. nudata

Binomial name
- Coreopsis nudata Nutt.

Synonyms
- Calliopsis nudata (Nutt.) Spreng.

= Coreopsis nudata =

Species of flowering plant

Coreopsis nudata, the Georgia tickseed, is a herbaceous perennial plant species of the genus Coreopsis in the family Asteraceae. It is native to the southeastern United States, in the states of Georgia, Florida, Alabama, Mississippi, and Louisiana.

Coreopsis nudata is a perennial herb sometimes as much as 100 cm (40 inches) tall. Flower heads have pink or purple ray florets and yellow disc florets. The species grows in swamps, ditches, and pine barrens.
