= Coreopsis integrifolia =

Conservation status
- Critically Imperiled (NatureServe)

Scientific classification
- Kingdom: Plantae
- Clade: Tracheophytes
- Clade: Angiosperms
- Clade: Eudicots
- Clade: Asterids
- Order: Asterales
- Family: Asteraceae
- Genus: Coreopsis
- Species: C. integrifolia

Binomial name
- Coreopsis integrifolia Poir.

Species of flowering plant

Coreopsis integrifolia (commonly known as the fringeleaf tickseed, mouse-ear tickseed, or chipola dye-flower) is a North American plant species of the family Asteraceae. It is native to the southeastern United States, in South Carolina, Georgia, and northern Florida.

Coreopsis integrifolia is a perennial up to 60 cm (2 feet) tall. Flower heads have yellow ray florets and purple disc florets.
