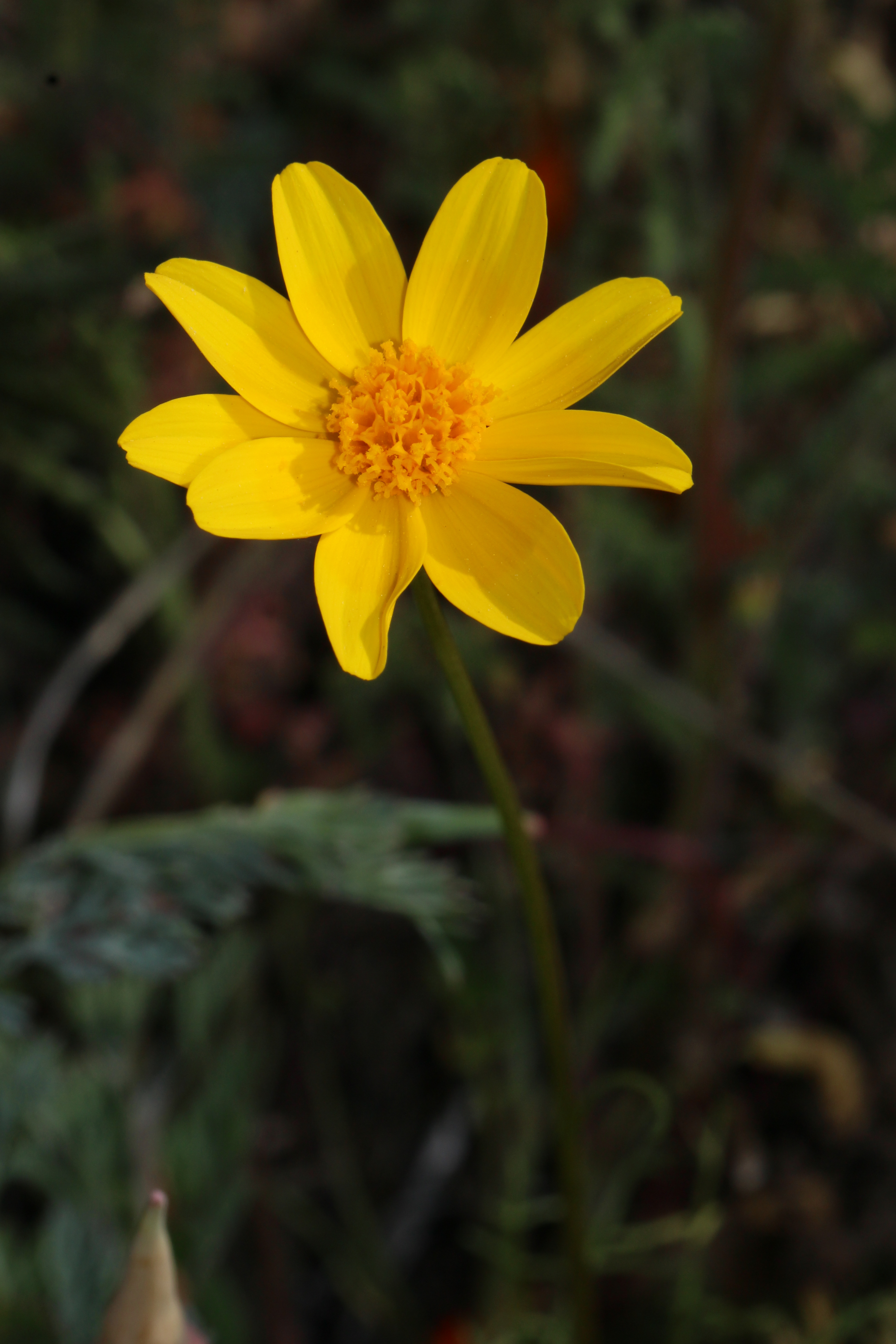
- Leptosyne bigelovii

Scientific classification
- Kingdom: Plantae
- Clade: Tracheophytes
- Clade: Angiosperms
- Clade: Eudicots
- Clade: Asterids
- Order: Asterales
- Family: Asteraceae
- Subfamily: Asteroideae
- Tribe: Coreopsideae
- Genus: Leptosyne; DC.

Species
- 8; see text

Synonyms
- Agarista DC.; Tuckermannia Nutt.

= Leptosyne =

Genus of flowering plants

Leptosyne is a genus of flowering plants in the family Asteraceae. It includes eight species native to California, Arizona, and northwestern Mexico.

== Species ==
Eight species are accepted.

- Leptosyne bigelovii (A.Gray) A.Gray
- Leptosyne californica Nutt.
- Leptosyne calliopsidea (DC.) A.Gray
- Leptosyne douglasii DC.
- Leptosyne gigantea Kellogg
- Leptosyne hamiltonii Elmer
- Leptosyne maritima (Nutt.) A.Gray
- Leptosyne stillmanii A.Gray
