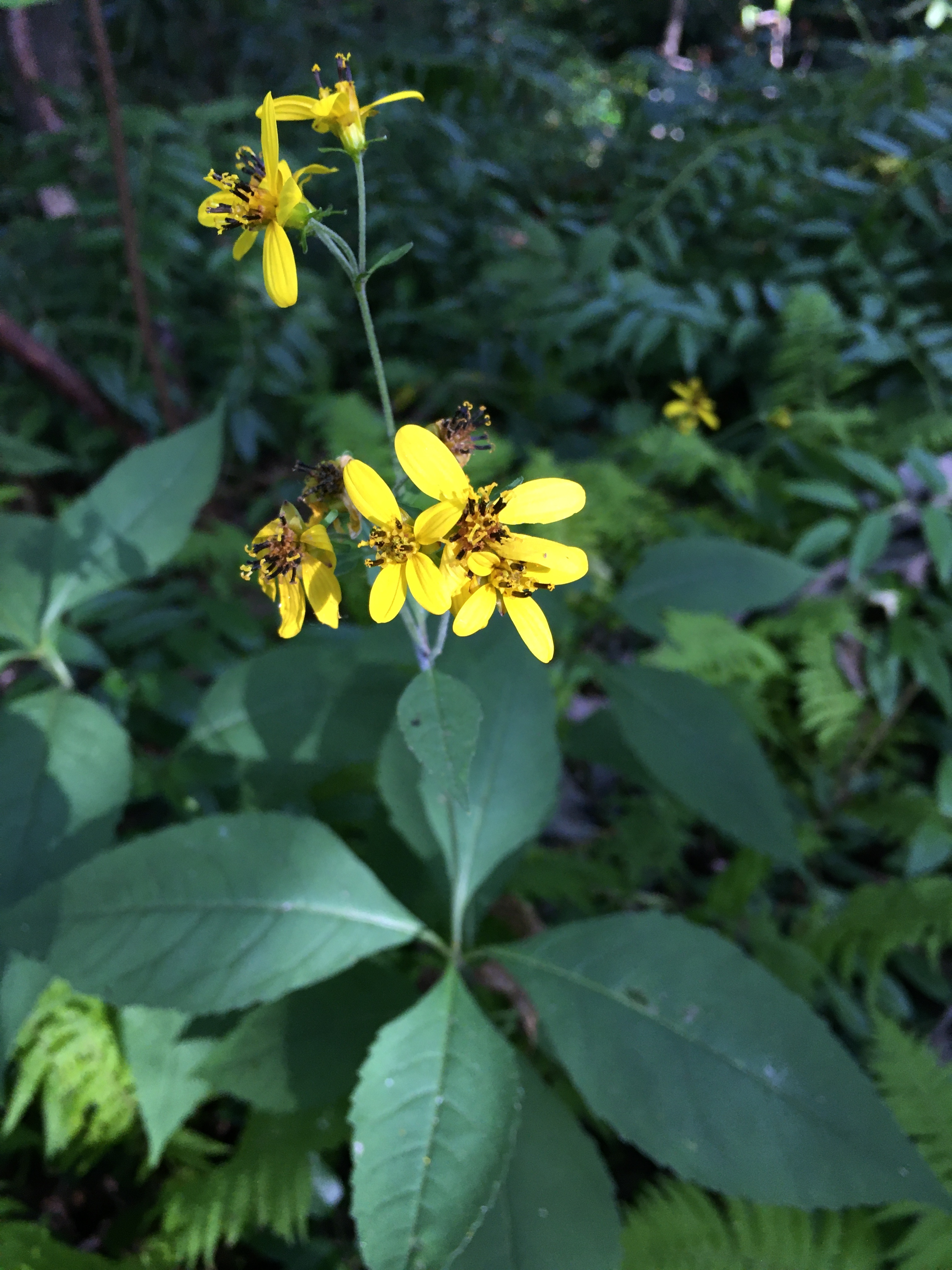

Conservation status
- Vulnerable (NatureServe)

Scientific classification
- Kingdom: Plantae
- Clade: Tracheophytes
- Clade: Angiosperms
- Clade: Eudicots
- Clade: Asterids
- Order: Asterales
- Family: Asteraceae
- Subfamily: Asteroideae
- Tribe: Coreopsideae
- Subtribe: Coreopsidinae
- Genus: Silphidium (Torr. & A.Gray) Mesfin & D.J.Crawford
- Species: S. latifolium

Binomial name
- Silphidium latifolium (Michx.) Mesfin & D.J.Crawford

Synonyms
- Coreopsis latifolia Michx. (1803) (basionym); Leiodon latifolius (Michx.) Shuttlew. ex Sherff

= Silphidium =

Species of flowering plant

Silphidium latifolium is a North American species of flowering plant in the aster family known by the common name broad-leaved tickseed. It is the sole species in genus Silphidium. It is native to the southeastern United States, primarily in the southern Appalachians of the states of Georgia, North Carolina, South Carolina, and Tennessee.

The species was first described as Coreopsis latifolia by André Michaux in 1803. In 2023 Mesfin Tadesse and Daniel J. Crawford placed the species in the new genus Silphidium as Silphidium latifolium.

== Description ==
Silphidium latifolium, a rhizomatous perennial herb, grows up to 1.5 metres (4.9 ft) tall. The leaves are oval and may exceed 20 centimetres (7.9 in) long by 10 centimetres (3.9 in) wide.

The inflorescence is a corymb of flower heads, each with five phyllaries which may be over a centimeter long. The head contains yellow ray florets between 1 and 2 centimeters long and yellow disc florets. Flowering occurs in August and September.

== Distribution ==
Silphidium latifolium is native to the Blue Ridge Mountains, its distribution extending from the Great Craggy Mountains to the South Carolina line. Populations in Tennessee are disjunct. The plant grows in moist hardwood forest habitat on mafic rock such as amphibolite or hornblende gneiss. It can sometimes be seen on roadsides. In its range it is most abundant in North Carolina, but it is rare in general.

It is likely a relict species which had a wider distribution in the past.

=== Conservation ===
Silphidium latifolium is threatened with the loss of its habitat, which is being consumed for development. It is a listed Vulnerable plant species. In some of its range it is considered to be stable and not declining quickly.
