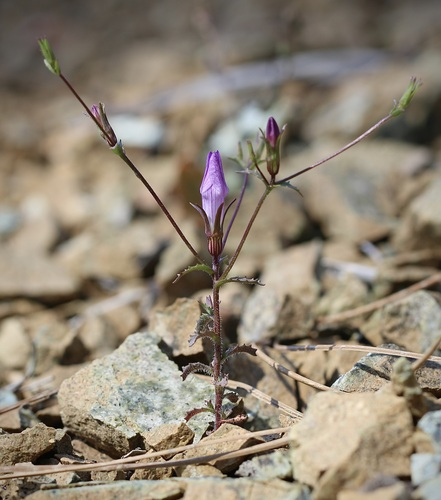

Conservation status
- Critically Imperiled (NatureServe)

Scientific classification
- Kingdom: Plantae
- Clade: Tracheophytes
- Clade: Angiosperms
- Clade: Eudicots
- Clade: Asterids
- Order: Asterales
- Family: Campanulaceae
- Genus: Ravenella
- Species: R. sharsmithiae

Binomial name
- Ravenella sharsmithiae (Morin) Morin (2020)

Synonyms
- Campanula sharsmithiae Morin (1980)

= Ravenella sharsmithiae =

Species of flowering plant

Ravenella sharsmithiae is a rare species of bellflower known by the common names Mt. Hamilton bellflower and Sharsmith's harebell. It is endemic to California, where it is known from just a few occurrences in the higher mountain peaks just south of the San Francisco Bay Area, including Mt. Hamilton and Mount Boardman in the Diablo Range. It is a small, hairy annual herb producing an erect stem up to 25 centimeters tall. The fleshy, toothed leaves are a centimeter long or less. The flower is funnel- or bell-shaped and purple in color. The plant is named for late local botanist Helen Sharsmith.

Previously considered part of the genus Campanula, this species (along with Ravenella exigua, Ravenella angustiflora, and Ravenella griffinii) were reclassed into the new genus Ravenella after several studies concluded that the genus was polyphyletic.
