= Luteum =

Luteum or lutea may refer to:

- Buglossidium luteum or Solenette
- Calostemma luteum
- Chamaelirium luteum or Chamaelirium
- Eriastrum luteum
- Oncis lutea
- Pentalinon luteum
- Rhododendron luteum
- Trillium luteum

== See also ==
- Atretic corpus luteum
- Corpus luteum
- Corpus luteum cyst
- Luteal phase
- Luteinizing hormone
