= Helen Sharsmith =

American botanist (1905–1982)

Helen Katherine Meyers Sharsmith
- Born: Helen Katherine Meyers; August 26, 1905; Oakland, California
- Died: 10 November 1982 (aged 77)
- Education: University of California, Berkeley
- Known for: Research on the native flora of California
- Spouse: Carl Sharsmith
- Children: 2
- Scientific career
- Fields: Botany
- Thesis: Flora of the Mount Hamilton Range of California (1945)
- Doctoral advisor: Herbert Mason
- Author abbrev. (botany): H.Sharsm.

Helen Katherine Meyers Sharsmith (August 26, 1905 – November 10, 1982) was an American biologist and educator. She was one of the first women botanists at the University of California and is recognized for her contributions to botanical research there.

== Biography ==
Helen Sharsmith was born in on August 26, 1905 in Oakland, California. She studied zoology at the University of California, Berkeley (UC Berkeley), earning a Bachelor's degree in zoology in 1927 and then a Master's degree and teaching credentials in 1928. For the next three years, she taught at Lassen High School and Junior College in Susanville.

She met Carl Sharsmith in 1930, at a summer class at the Yosemite Field School of Natural History in Yosemite National Park. They married in 1931. During this time, Carl was studying at the University of California, Los Angeles (UCLA), and there Helen met botanist Carl Epling and carried out research with UCLA botany professor Flora Murray Scott.

In 1932 they both transferred to UC Berkeley to enroll in the botany PhD program. Both were advised by Herbert Mason and received their doctorates in 1940. Sharsmith's dissertation, titled Flora of the Mount Hamilton Range of California, was based on her extensive field research in the area.

While earning her degree, Sharsmith worked as a research assistant at the University of California. She also worked as a biology teacher at Mills College. Later, she worked as a biology assistant at the Carnegie Institution of Washington.

After graduating, the two moved to the state of Washington, where Carl taught at Washington State University for three years.

In 1950 she became a senior herbarium botanist at the Berkeley Herbarium, where she ran public service activities, including the university's extensive plant exchange program. During this time she also contributed research papers to scientific journal Madroño, and in 1965 she published Spring Wildflowers of the San Francisco Bay Region. She retired in 1969.

== Personal life ==
Helen Sharsmith enjoyed photography and preferred to develop and print the photos herself.

The Sharsmiths had two children, a son and a daughter, sometime after 1938. During their marriage, they had a tradition of visiting Yosemite National Park every year. They later divorced.

== Death and legacy ==
After retirement, Sharsmith developed Parkinson's disease. She died at the Chaparral House Intermediate Care Facility in Berkeley on November 10, 1982. After her death, Carl Sharsmith established the Helen K. Sharsmith Award, which the California Native Plant Society awards to provide grant money to researchers (students and non-students) studying the native flora of California. Her friend Annetta Carter wrote an obituary which was published in Fremontia, a journal published by the California Native Plant Society.

Sharsmith is recognized for her contributions to botanical research at the University of California. She is also noted as one of the first women botanists at the University of California.

Species named after Sharsmith include Sharsmith's onion (Allium sharsmithiae), Sharsmith's harebell (Ravenella sharsmithiae), and Sharsmith's draba (Draba sharsmithii). Ivan Murray Johnston named Sharsmith's stickseed (Hackelia sharsmithii) after Carl Sharsmith, but Carl and Helen discovered it together at Mirror Lake after climbing Mount Whitney.

== Works ==
- Plant Life and Glaciers was co-written by Helen and Carl Sharsmith and published in a 1935 edition of Yosemite Nature Notes (former publication of Yosemite National Park). It describes the interconnected histories of the plant life and glaciers in the Yosemite area.
- Sharsmith's 1945 doctoral dissertation, Flora of the Mount Hamilton Range of California, details native flora in the Mount Hamilton area. The Santa Clara Chapter of the California Native Plant Society published the dissertation in 1982.
- A New Species of Linum From the Coast Ranges of California, published in 1945, describes Linum bicarpellatum.
- The Genus Hesperolinon (Linnaceae) is a 1961 monographic morphological study of flowers in the genus Hesperolinon. It was cited in the book Principles of Plant Taxonomy, with authors David and Heywood noting that it was an excellent morphological study.
- Spring Wildflowers of the San Francisco Bay Region (1965)

== See also ==
- List of California native plants
- List of women botanists
- Streptanthus callistus – one of Sharsmith's favorite plants, according to Annetta Carter
