= Schinia aurantiaca =

Scientific classification
- Domain: Eukaryota
- Kingdom: Animalia
- Phylum: Arthropoda
- Class: Insecta
- Order: Lepidoptera
- Superfamily: Noctuoidea
- Family: Noctuidae
- Genus: Schinia
- Species: S. aurantiaca

Binomial name
- Schinia aurantiaca (H. Edwards, 1881)

Synonyms
- Annaphila aurantiaca H. Edwards, 1881; Schinia californica (Hampson, 1903); Pyrocleptria californica Hampson, 1903

Species of moth

Schinia aurantiaca is a moth of the family Noctuidae. It is found in North America, including California and Arizona.

The wingspan is about 17 mm.

The larvae feed on Eriastrum sapphirinum and Gilia species.

== Subspecies ==
- Schinia aurantiaca aurantiaca
- Schinia aurantiaca tenuimargo
