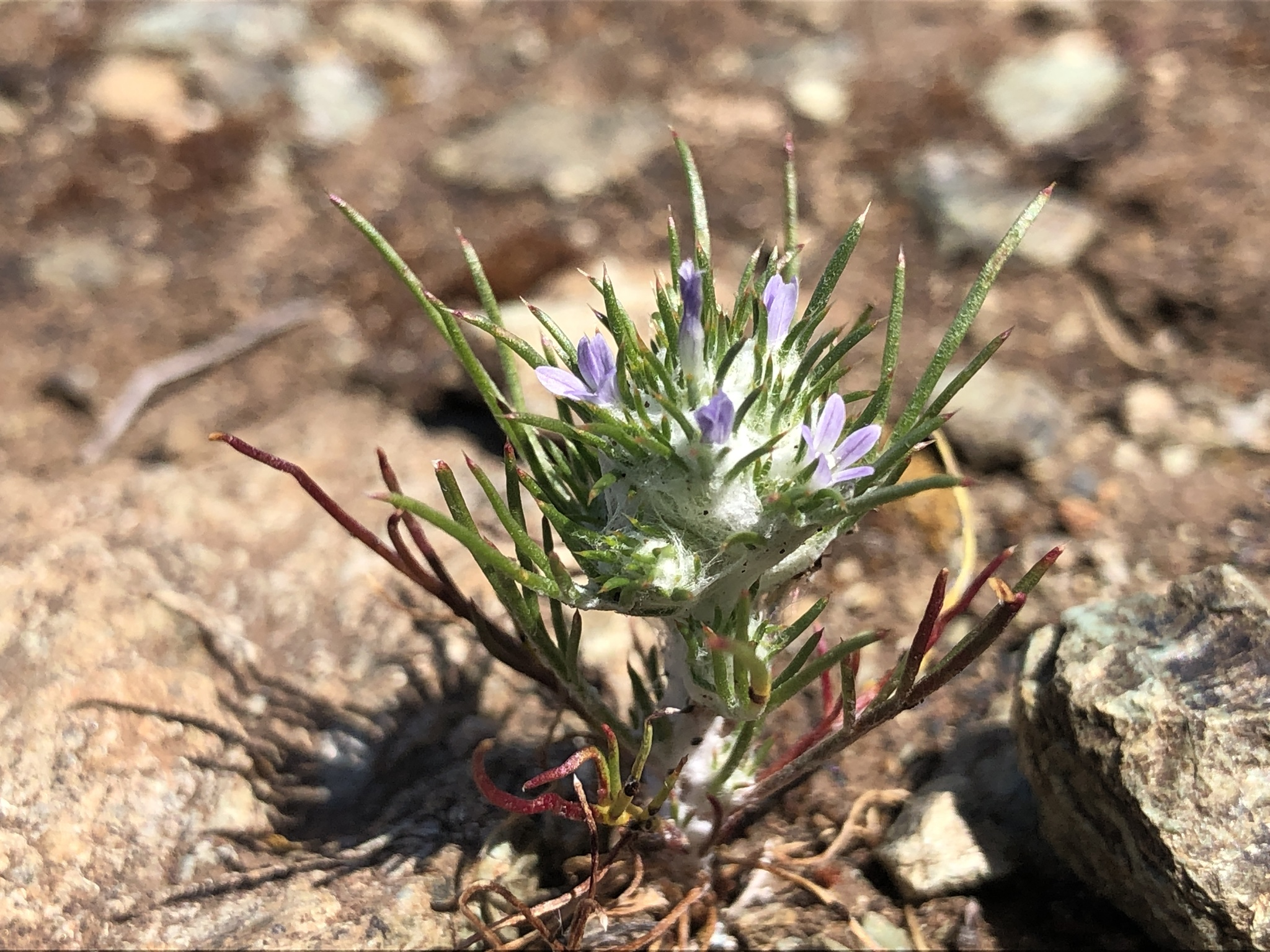

Scientific classification
- Kingdom: Plantae
- Clade: Tracheophytes
- Clade: Angiosperms
- Clade: Eudicots
- Clade: Asterids
- Order: Ericales
- Family: Polemoniaceae
- Genus: Eriastrum
- Species: E. abramsii

Binomial name
- Eriastrum abramsii (Elmer) H.Mason

Synonyms
- Hugelia abramsii (Elmer) Jeps. & V.L.Bailey; Navarretia abramsii Elmer

= Eriastrum abramsii =

Species of flowering plant

Eriastrum abramsii is a species of flowering plant in the phlox family known by the common name Abrams' woollystar. The epithet abramsii commemorates LeRoy Abrams. It is endemic to California, where it is known from the hills of the Coast Ranges in and around the San Francisco Bay Area. It is an annual herb producing a thin, usually woolly stem up to about 15 centimeters tall. The leaves are divided into several narrow, threadlike linear lobes. The inflorescence is a woolly cluster of narrow, leaflike bracts laced with webby fibers. The small flowers have yellow throats and white or blue corolla lobes.
