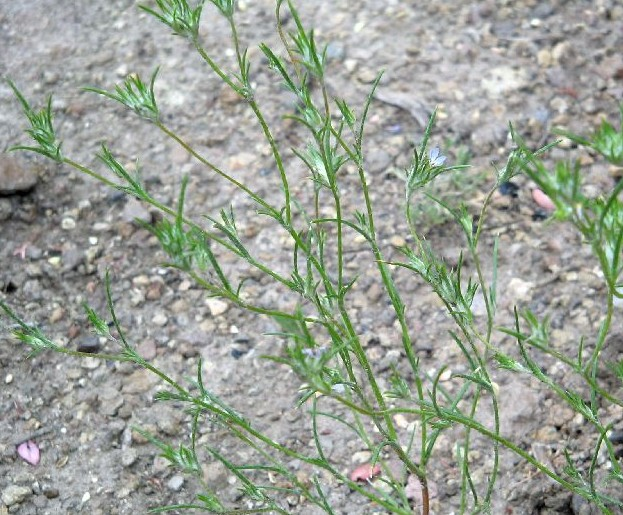

Scientific classification
- Kingdom: Plantae
- Clade: Tracheophytes
- Clade: Angiosperms
- Clade: Eudicots
- Clade: Asterids
- Order: Ericales
- Family: Polemoniaceae
- Genus: Eriastrum
- Species: E. wilcoxii

Binomial name
- Eriastrum wilcoxii (A.Nelson) H.Mason

= Eriastrum wilcoxii =

Species of flowering plant

Eriastrum wilcoxii is a species of flowering plant in the phlox family known by the common name Wilcox's woollystar. It is native to the western United States, where it grows in various types of desert and plateau habitat. It is an annual herb producing a thin, branching, usually woolly stem up to about 30 centimeters tall. The leaves are narrow and thready, up to 3 centimeters long, and sometimes divided into two or more lobes. The inflorescence is a woolly cluster of narrow, leaflike bracts laced with webby fibers. The small flowers have yellow throats and blue corollas with lobes up to half a centimeter long.
