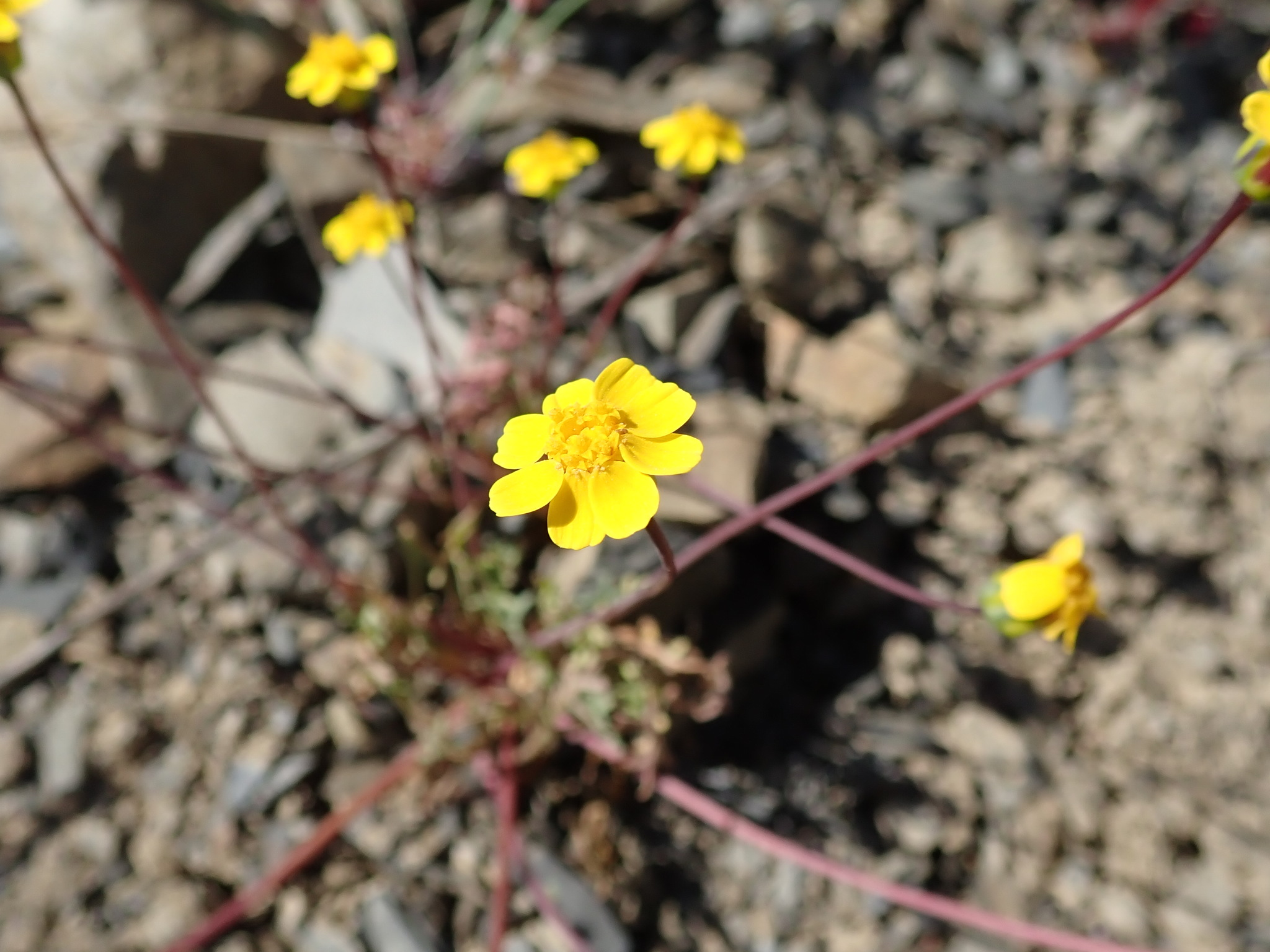

Conservation status
- Imperiled (NatureServe)

Scientific classification
- Kingdom: Plantae
- Clade: Tracheophytes
- Clade: Angiosperms
- Clade: Eudicots
- Clade: Asterids
- Order: Asterales
- Family: Asteraceae
- Subfamily: Asteroideae
- Tribe: Coreopsideae
- Genus: Leptosyne
- Species: L. hamiltonii

Binomial name
- Leptosyne hamiltonii Elmer

Synonyms
- Coreopsis hamiltonii (Elmer) H.Sharsm.

= Leptosyne hamiltonii =

Species of flowering plant

Leptosyne hamiltonii, the Mt. Hamilton coreopsis or Mt. Hamilton tickseed, is a rare California species of Leptosyne in the family Asteraceae. It is found only in a small region including Mount Hamilton and the Diablo Range in the southwestern San Francisco Bay Area (Alameda, Santa Clara, and Stanislaus Counties).

== Description ==
Leptosyne hamiltonii typically grows 10–20 centimetres (3.9–7.9 in) tall or sometimes taller when in bloom. The foliage is low growing, producing bright golden yellow colored flower heads and red purplish tinted peduncles. The foliage is deeply cut with a thin ferny shape.

It can be found blooming from March to May in California, where plants are found growing from 600–1,300 metres (2,000–4,300 ft) above sea level.
