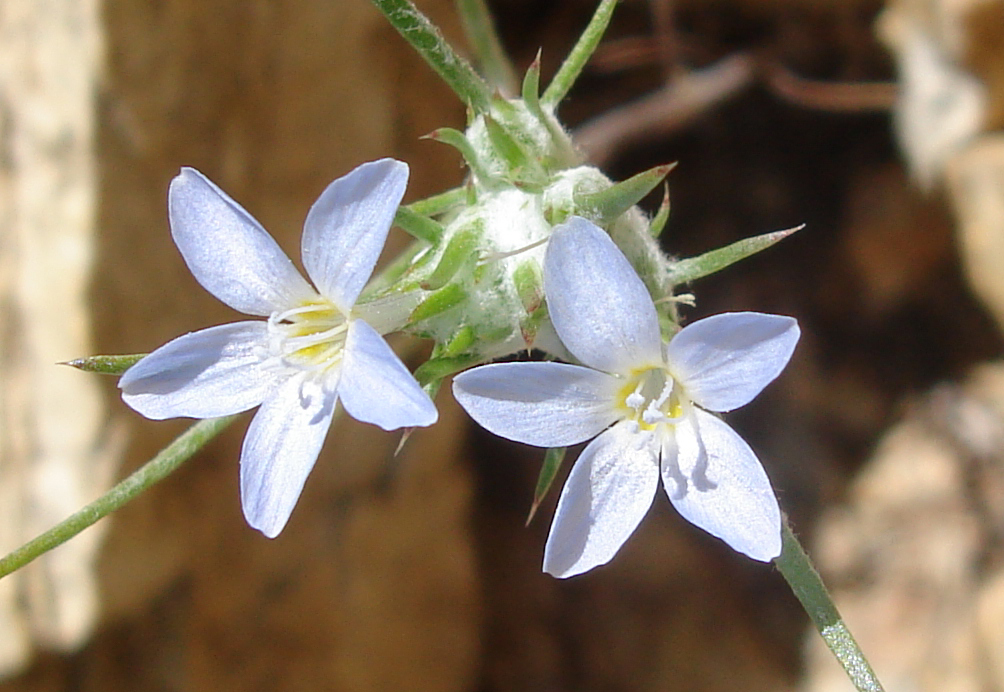

Conservation status
- Secure (NatureServe)

Scientific classification
- Kingdom: Plantae
- Clade: Embryophytes
- Clade: Tracheophytes
- Clade: Angiosperms
- Clade: Eudicots
- Clade: Asterids
- Order: Ericales
- Family: Polemoniaceae
- Genus: Eriastrum
- Species: E. diffusum

Binomial name
- Eriastrum diffusum (A.Gray) H.Mason

Subspecies
- E. d. subsp. coachellae; E. d. subsp. diffusum; E. d. subsp. utahense

Synonyms
- Hugelia diffusa; Welwitschia diffusa

= Eriastrum diffusum =

Plant species in the phlox family

Eriastrum diffusum is a species of flowering plant in the phlox family known by the common name miniature woollystar. It is native to the southwestern United States from California to Texas, where it grows in many types of open habitat. This is an annual herb producing a thin, usually woolly stem up to about 20 centimeters long, growing erect or spreading outward. The leaves are divided into 2 to 4 narrow, threadlike linear lobes. The inflorescence is a woolly cluster of narrow, leaflike bracts laced with webby fibers. The small flowers are funnel-shaped, with yellowish throats and white to pale blue corollas.

== Taxonomy ==
In 1870 Asa Gray described a variety of Gilia filifolia he named diffusa. It was described as a species twice before Herbert Louis Mason moved it to the genus Eriastrum creating the accepted species name. Together with its genus it is classified in the Polemoniaceae family. It has three subspecies.

- Eriastrum diffusum subsp. coachellae – Native to California
- Eriastrum diffusum subsp. diffusum – Widespread in the southwestern US and northern Mexico
- Eriastrum diffusum subsp. utahense – Native to Utah

Eriastrum diffusum has 9 synonyms of the species or one of its three subspecies.

Table of Synonyms
Name	Year	Rank	Synonym of:	Notes
Eriastrum diffusum var. coachellae (S.J.De Groot) Tiehm	2023	variety	subsp. coachellae	≡ hom.
Eriastrum diffusum subsp. jonesii H.Mason	1945	subspecies	subsp. diffusum	= het.
Eriastrum diffusum var. utahense (S.J.De Groot) Tiehm	2023	variety	subsp. utahense	≡ hom.
Gilia filifolia var. diffusa A.Gray	1870	variety	E. diffusum	≡ hom.
Hugelia diffusa (A.Gray) Jeps.	1943	species	E. diffusum	≡ hom.
Hugelia virgata var. pygmaea Jeps.	1925	variety	subsp. diffusum	= het.
Navarretia filifolia var. diffusa (A.Gray) Brand	1907	variety	E. diffusum	≡ hom.
Welwitschia diffusa (A.Gray) Rydb.	1917	species	E. diffusum	≡ hom.
Welwitschia filifolia var. diffusa (A.Gray) Tidestr.	1935	variety	E. diffusum	≡ hom.
Notes: ≡ homotypic synonym; = heterotypic synonym
