= Annetta Mary Carter =

American botanist (1907–1991)

- Born: June 28, 1907; Sierra Madre, California, U.S.
- Died: May 8, 1991 (aged 83); Berkeley, California, U.S.
- Education: University of California, Berkeley
- Scientific career
- Fields: Botany, Plant collector
- Author abbrev. (botany): A.M.Carter

Annetta Mary Carter (June 28, 1907 – May 8, 1991) was an American botanist.

== Early life ==
Carter was born on June 28, 1907, in Sierra Madre, California. After the death of her mother, Carter's father spent the summers working in the San Gabriel Mountains as a fire guard, giving Carter the freedom to explore her surroundings and develop an appreciation for nature. Her interest in botany was encouraged and supported by her botany teacher at Pasadena High School.

== Education and career ==
In 1928, Carter enrolled in the Botany program at the University of California, Berkeley. She graduated in 1930 with her A.B. in Botany. Her graduating class consisted on 7 women, including Mary L. Bowerman. Carter went on to pursue her master's degree with a focus in the morphology of floating liverwort. Her studies during the program were supervised by William Albert Setchell.

After receiving her M.A. in 1932, Carter went on to work at the University of California, Berkeley Herbarium where she began as a mounter. She remained with the herbarium under the title Principal Herbarium Botanist until her retirement in 1968. Despite having officially retired, Carter continued to assist the herbarium as a Research Associate. Whilst employed at the herbarium, Carter began collecting throughout California. Much of her research and collecting was focused on the volcanic range Sierra de la Giganta in Baja California. In 1947, Carter went on an expedition in this region and was able to discover a new species that she named Acacia kelloggiana after her colleague who was with her.

She joined the Society of Woman Geographers in 1974 and was co-chair of the San Francisco Bay Area chapter from 1978 to 1984. She gave a speech on "Plants and man in the Sierra de la Giganta" at the 1984 triennial meeting in Washington, D.C.

== Personal life and death ==
Carter became ill after age 80, was diagnosed with multiple myeloma, and ultimately died in Berkeley on May 8, 1991, at the age of 83.

== Standard author abbreviation ==
The standard author abbreviation A.M.Carter is used to indicate this person as the author when citing a botanical name.

== See also ==
- Mary Leolin Bowerman
- Herbert Louis Mason
- Carl Sharsmith
- Helen Sharsmith
