= Eriastrum virgatum =

Scientific classification
- Kingdom: Plantae
- Clade: Tracheophytes
- Clade: Angiosperms
- Clade: Eudicots
- Clade: Asterids
- Order: Ericales
- Family: Polemoniaceae
- Genus: Eriastrum
- Species: E. virgatum

Binomial name
- Eriastrum virgatum (Benth.) H.Mason

Species of flowering plant

Eriastrum virgatum is a species of flowering plant in the phlox family known by the common name wand woollystar. It is endemic to California, where it is known the coastline and coastal mountain ranges of Monterey and San Benito Counties. It grows in chaparral and coastal and inland scrub habitat. It is an annual herb producing a thin, usually woolly stem up to about 40 centimeters tall. The leaves are narrow and thick, up to 5 centimeters long, and sometimes divided into two narrow lobes. The inflorescence is a woolly cluster of narrow, leaflike bracts laced with webby fibers. The flowers have yellow throats and bright blue corollas with lobes up to a centimeter long.
