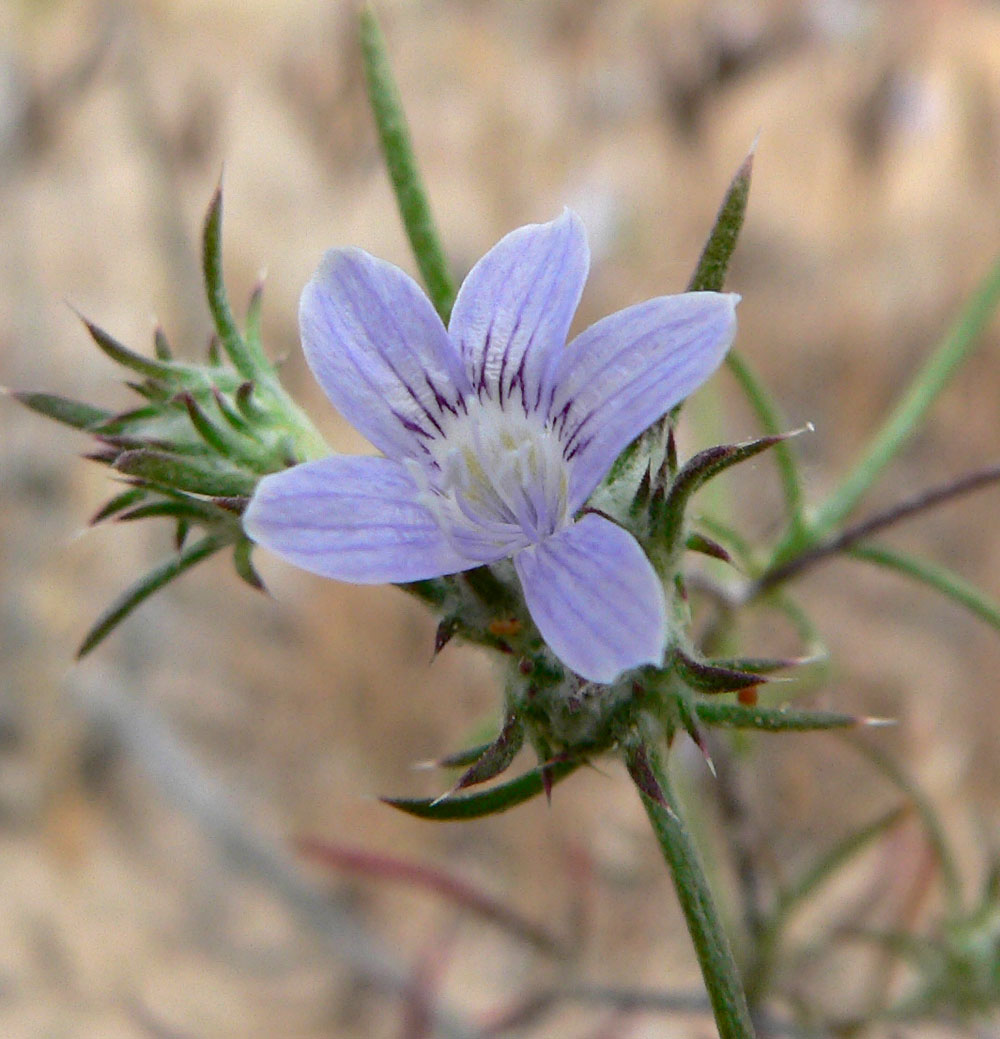
- Eriastrum eremicum

Scientific classification
- Kingdom: Plantae
- Clade: Tracheophytes
- Clade: Angiosperms
- Clade: Eudicots
- Clade: Asterids
- Order: Ericales
- Family: Polemoniaceae
- Genus: Eriastrum; Wooton & Standl. (1913)

Species
- 18; see text

Synonyms
- Hugelia Benth. (1833), non Huegelia Rchb.; Welwitschia Rchb. (1837), nom. rej.

= Eriastrum =

Genus of flowering plants

Eriastrum is a genus of flowering plants in the phlox family which are known commonly as woollystars. These wildflowers are somewhat diverse in appearance but are usually erect, thin-stemmed herbs which bear purple to white blooms. Most species have inflorescences which are webbed with a woolly mesh of white fibers. Woollystars are native to western North America.

== Species ==
18 species are accepted.

- Eriastrum abramsii (Elmer) H.Mason - Abrams' woollystar
- Eriastrum calocyanum S.J.De Groot
- Eriastrum densifolium (Benth.) H.Mason - giant woollystar
- Eriastrum diffusum (A.Gray) H.Mason - miniature woollystar
- Eriastrum eremicum (Jeps.) H.Mason - desert woollystar
- Eriastrum ertterae D.Gowen
- Eriastrum filifolium (Nutt.) Wooton & Standl. - lavender woollystar
- Eriastrum harwoodii (T.T.Craig) D.Gowen
- Eriastrum hooveri (Jeps.) H.Mason - Hoover's woollystar
- Eriastrum luteum (Benth.) H.Mason - yellow woollystar
- Eriastrum pluriflorum (A.Heller) H.Mason - Tehachapi woollystar
- Eriastrum rosamondense D.Gowen
- Eriastrum sapphirinum (Eastw.) H.Mason - sapphire woollystar
- Eriastrum signatum D.Gowen
- Eriastrum sparsiflorum Eastw.) H.Mason - Great Basin woollystar
- Eriastrum tracyi H.Mason (syn. Eriastrum brandegeeae H.Mason) - Brandegee's woollystar
- Eriastrum virgatum (Benth.) H.Mason - wand woollystar
- Eriastrum wilcoxii (A.Nelson) H.Mason - Wilcox's woollystar
