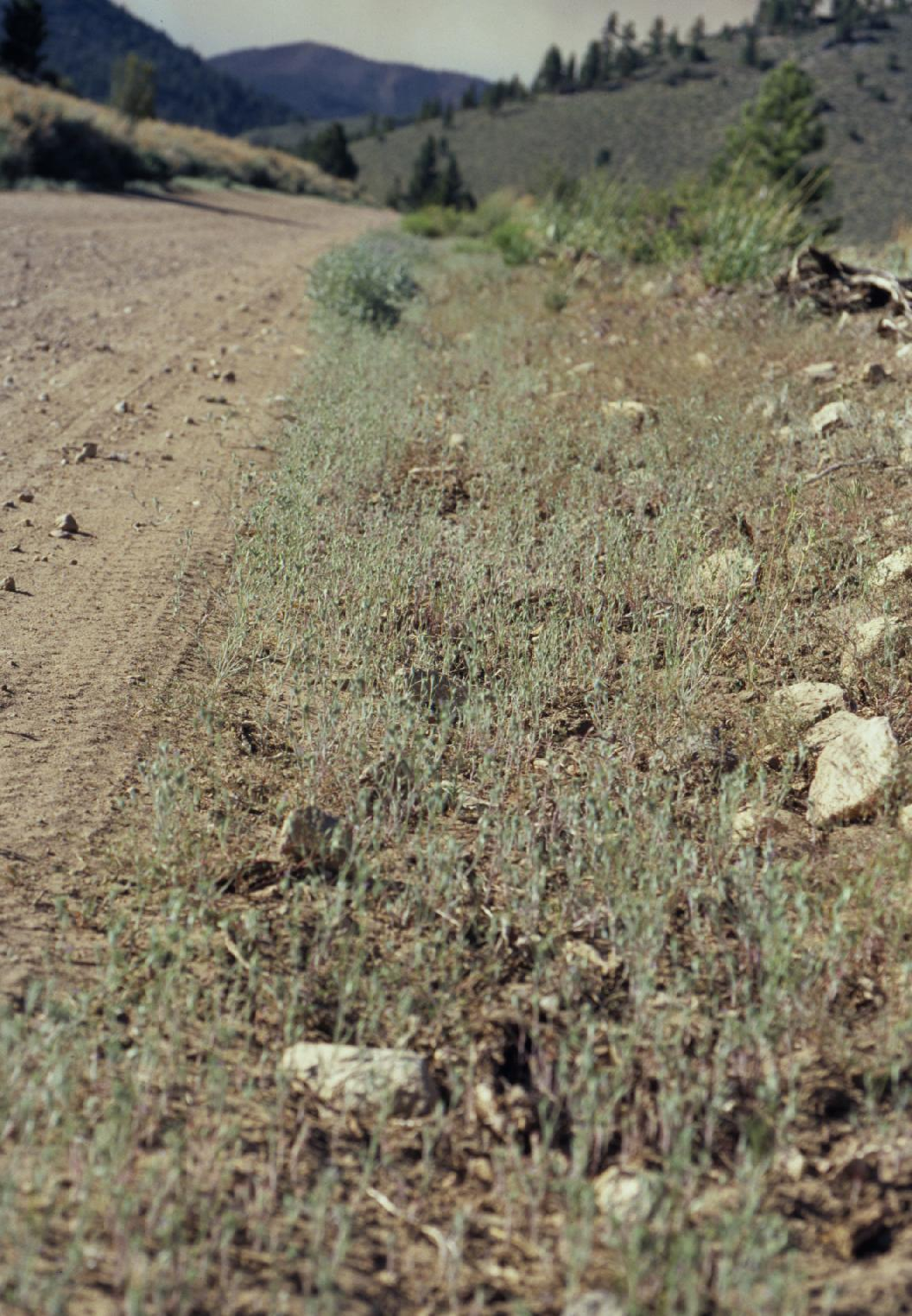

Conservation status
- Apparently Secure (NatureServe)

Scientific classification
- Kingdom: Plantae
- Clade: Tracheophytes
- Clade: Angiosperms
- Clade: Eudicots
- Clade: Asterids
- Order: Ericales
- Family: Polemoniaceae
- Genus: Eriastrum
- Species: E. sparsiflorum

Binomial name
- Eriastrum sparsiflorum (Eastw.) H.Mason

= Eriastrum sparsiflorum =

Species of flowering plant

Eriastrum sparsiflorum is an annual plant in the phlox family (Polemoniaceae) native to the Great Basin of the Western United States.
