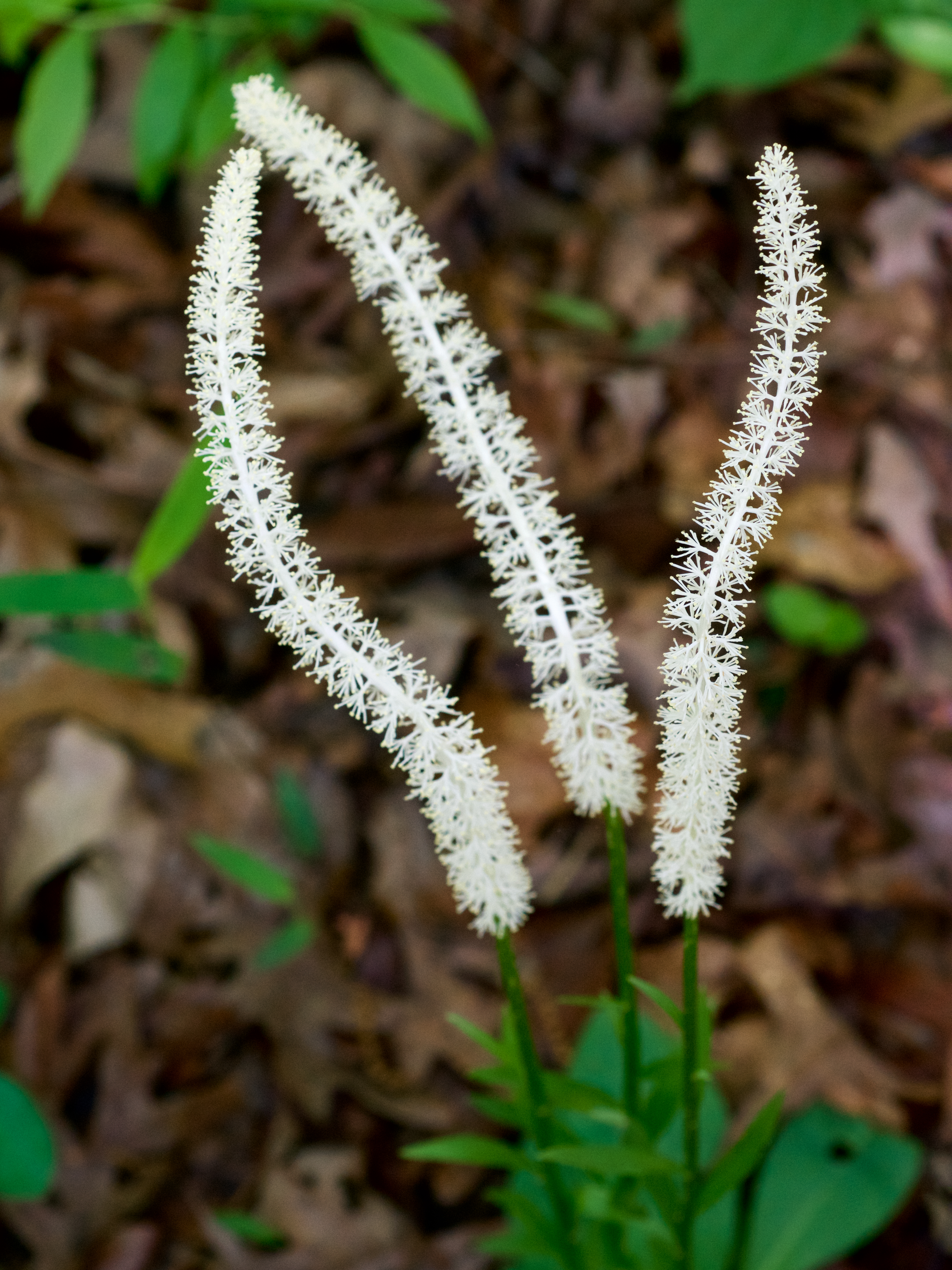
- Inflorescence of Chamaelirium luteum

Scientific classification
- Kingdom: Plantae
- Clade: Embryophytes
- Clade: Tracheophytes
- Clade: Angiosperms
- Clade: Monocots
- Order: Liliales
- Family: Melanthiaceae
- Tribe: Chionographideae
- Genus: Chamaelirium; Willd.

Species
- See text.

Synonyms
- Abalon Adans., not validly publ.; Chionographis Maxim.; Dasurus Salisb.; Diclinotrys Raf.; Ophiostachys Redouté; Siraitos Raf.

= Chamaelirium =

Genus of flowering plants

Chamaelirium is a genus of flowering plants in the family Melanthiaceae, native to eastern Asia and central and western northern America. Its synonyms include Chionographis.

== Description ==
Chamaelirium species are perennial flowering plants that grow from tuberous rhizomes. They produce a basal rosette of evergreen leaves, from the centre of which a flowering scape emerges in spring. The scape produces a spike of white flowers. When perfect, the flowers have six tepals, one pistil with three styles, and six stamens. However, not all individuals have perfect flowers. Some species have only three or four tepals. Many populations feature gynodioecy, and androdioecy.

== Taxonomy ==
Chamaelirium was established by Carl Ludwig Willdenow in 1808 as a monotypic genus with the sole species Chamaelirium luteum. It was initially distinguished from the genus Chionographis, established by Karl Maximovich in 1867, with which it had many similarities, by its actinomorphic flowers with equal tepals, as opposed to zygomorphic flowers with unequal tepals. However, species newly added to Chionographis had actinomorphic flowers, and in 2017 Noriyuki Tanaka decided that the two genera should be synonymized under Chamaelirium, with Chamaelirium luteum placed in section Chamaelirium and the former Chionographis species placed in section Chionographis. Among other features, the expanded genus Chamaelirium is unique in the family Melanthiaceae in the morphology of its pollen grains, which are have spherical and tetraporate pollen. The merger was accepted by Plants of the World Online as of August 2026.

=== Species ===
As of March 2024, Plants of the World Online accepted the following species:

- Chamaelirium actinomorphum (Aver. & N.Tanaka) N.Tanaka & Aver.
- Chamaelirium chinense (K.Krause) N.Tanaka
- Chamaelirium cordifolium (N.Tanaka) N.Tanaka
- Chamaelirium hisauchianum (Okuyama) N.Tanaka
- Chamaelirium japonicum (Willd.) N.Tanaka
- Chamaelirium jiuwanshanense Ying Qin & Yan Liu
- Chamaelirium koidzumianum (Ohwi) N.Tanaka
- Chamaelirium luteum (L.) A.Gray
- Chamaelirium nanlingense (L.Wu, Y.Tong & Q.R.Liu) N.Tanaka
- Chamaelirium shimentaiense Y.H.Tong, C.M.He & Y.Q.Li
- Chamaelirium shiwandashanense (Y.Feng Huang & R.H.Jiang) N.Tanaka
- Chamaelirium viridiflorum Lei Wang, Z.C.Liu & W.B.Liao

== Distribution and habitat ==
Chamaelirium species are native to Japan, Korea, southeast China and Vietnam, with one species found in eastern North America from Ontario to Florida. In Asia, they typically grow in moist places in the understory of temperate forests.
