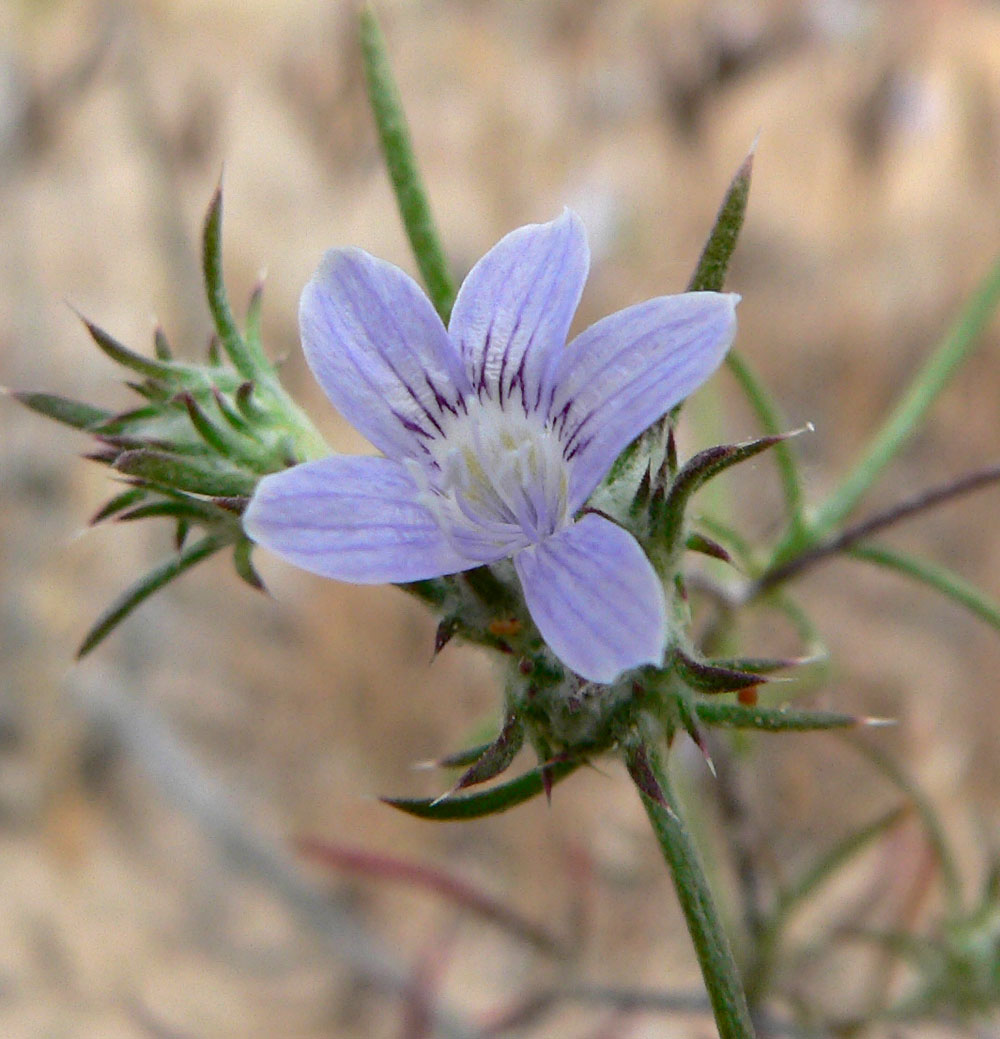

Scientific classification
- Kingdom: Plantae
- Clade: Tracheophytes
- Clade: Angiosperms
- Clade: Eudicots
- Clade: Asterids
- Order: Ericales
- Family: Polemoniaceae
- Genus: Eriastrum
- Species: E. eremicum

Binomial name
- Eriastrum eremicum (Jeps.) H.Mason

= Eriastrum eremicum =

Species of flowering plant

Eriastrum eremicum is an annual plant in the phlox family (Polemoniaceae) that is commonly known as the desert woollystar. It is native to southwestern United States in the Sonoran Desert. It grows in great abundance, covering the desert floor with deep blue color.

== Flower Description ==
The yellow buds open between the months of April and June. There are five gamopetalous petals that form its corolla. Each petal turns from yellow in the center to white with dark purple stripes to a lighter purple or lavender color. The flower is zygomorphic with a bilateral symmetry.

== Distribution and habitat ==
Eriastrum plants are native to south-western parts of North America. Woollystars are found in open areas. They grow best in sand or gravel type soils. They are considered to be in a plant community consisting of grasslands and shrubs. The plant is often found in the Sonoran Desert which consists of Northern Mexico and states like Nevada and Arizona.

Map of the Sonoran Desert Area

== Conservation Status ==
The woollystar is not considered endangered. The last global status review was from 1988 and it is in need of review again. As of right now it is a G5 rated species on a global level.

== History ==
The history of the Eriastrum genus is not exactly direct. There is often much confusion between Eriastrum variations. The species, such as E. eremicum and E. virgatum have so many similarities that they are often mixed up from observing there phenotypes.
