= Carl Sharsmith =

American naturalist and park ranger

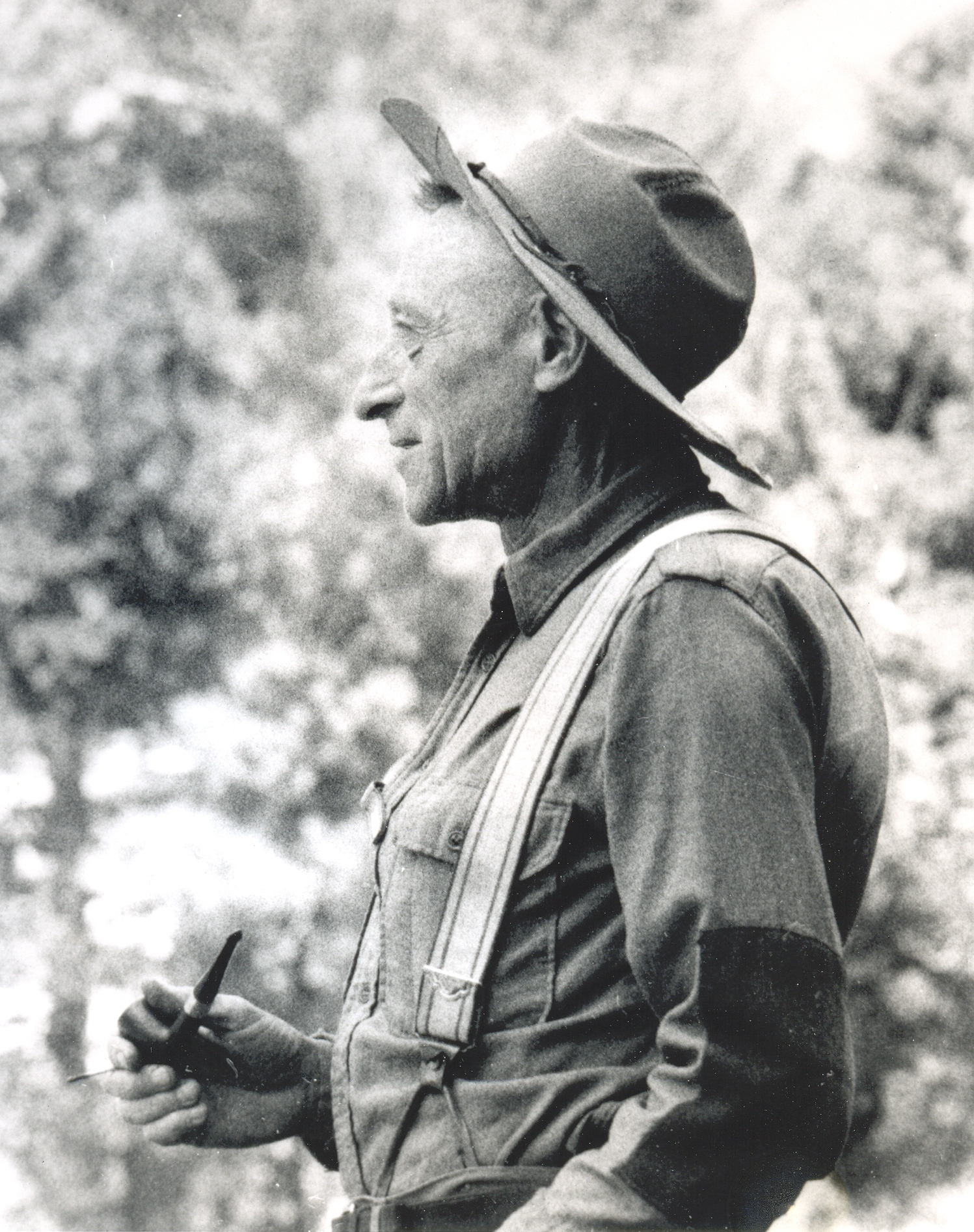
- Sharsmith as a Park Ranger
- Born: Karl Wilhelm Schaarschmidt II; March 14, 1903; New York City, New York, U.S.
- Died: October 14, 1994 (aged 91); San Jose, California, U.S.
- Education: University of California, Los Angeles (BA); University of California, Berkeley (PhD)
- Known for: The first botanist to document the alpine flora of the high Sierra Nevada
- Scientific career
- Fields: Botany

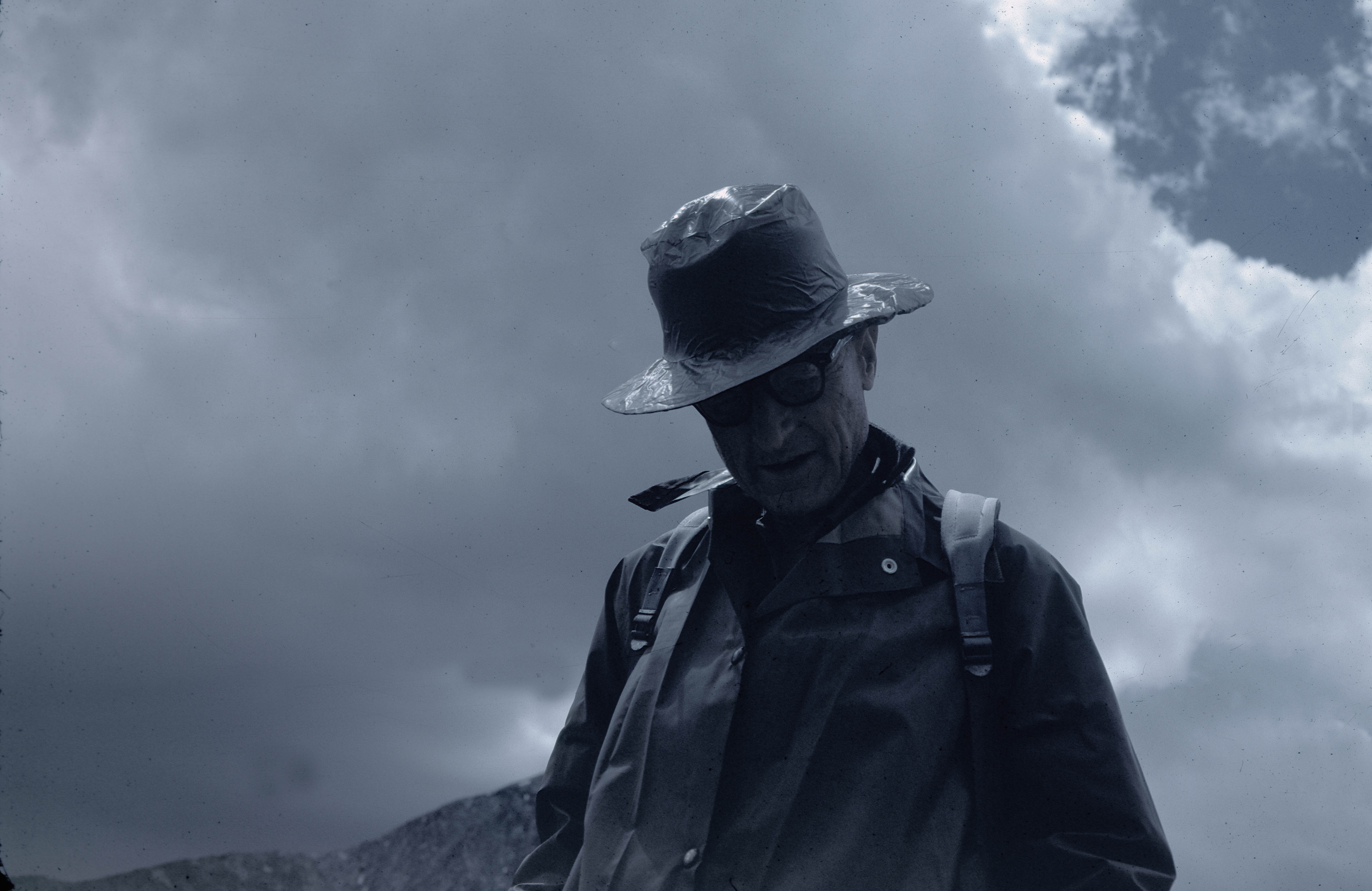
July 1979 on Dana Plateau, Mono County, California

Carl William Sharsmith (March 14, 1903 – October 14, 1994) was an American naturalist and Yosemite park ranger, notable for his knowledge and interpretation of the natural history of the Sierra Nevada. He taught botany at various universities, and was the first botanist to comprehensively document the alpine flora of the high Sierra Nevada.

== Biography ==
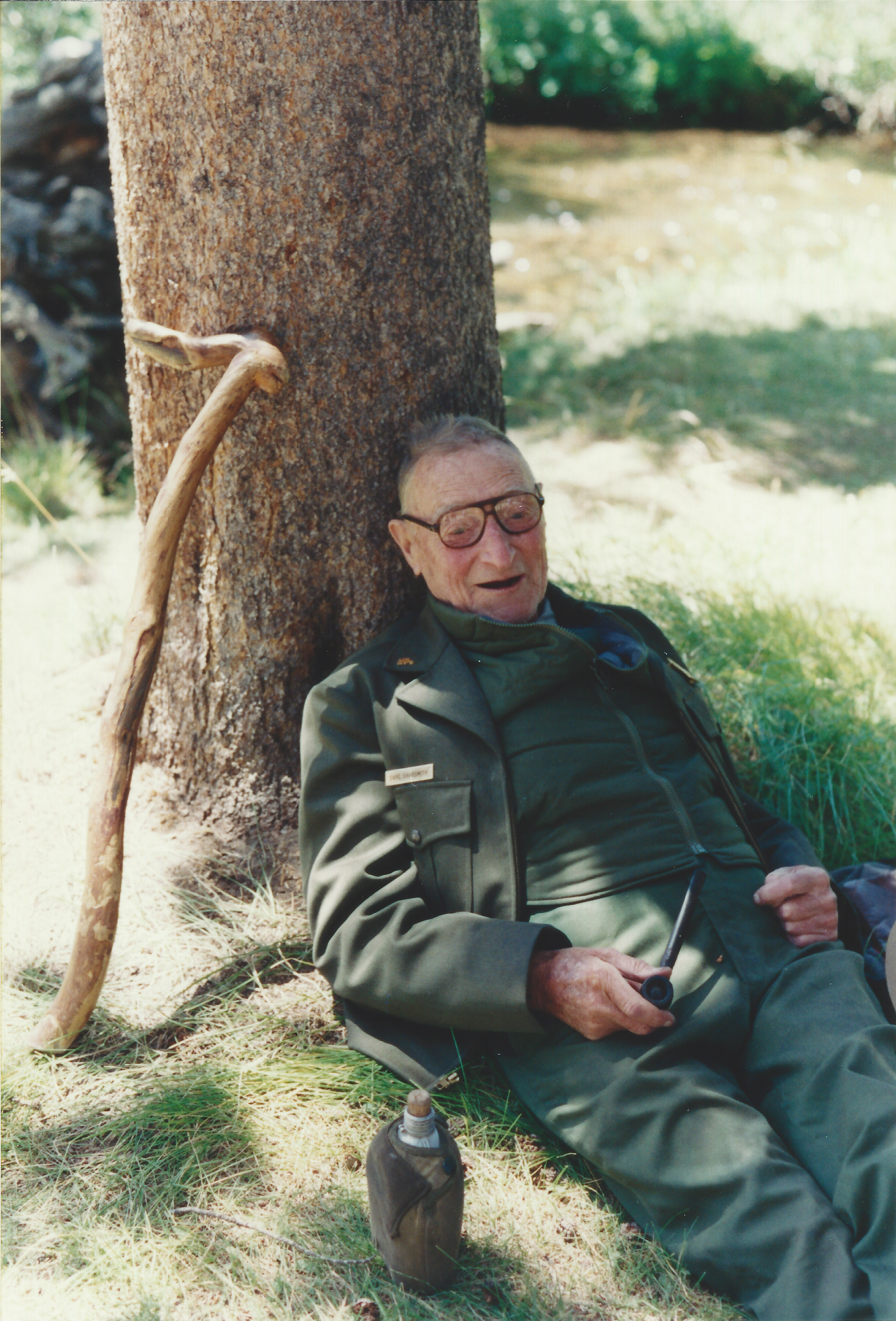
Summer 1994 in the Tuolumne Meadows

Born Karl Wilhelm Schaarschmidt II in New York City to Swiss and German parents, he grew up the U.S., Europe, and Canada. Sharsmith was inspired by the works of naturalist John Muir and became interested in the outdoors and nature. He dropped out of school at 14, but resumed his formal education at the Yosemite School of Field Natural History in 1930. The following year he was hired as a seasonal Ranger-Naturalist in Tuolumne Meadows, Yosemite National Park, exploring nearly every "nook and cranny" of Yosemite's High Sierra

He completed a BA at UCLA in 1933, and a PhD (botany) at UC Berkeley in 1940.

He taught or researched at various schools, including: Stanford University, the University of Minnesota, and San Jose State University. Sharsmith was Professor of Botany at San Jose State from 1950 to 1973.

On his opinion of teaching he said, "people are not interested in facts. The greater appeal is to the heart." On nature walks, he would often kneel down and talk about a flower. One of his favorite flowers was Raggedy Aster (Aster integrifolius). When asked what he would do if he only had a day to see Yosemite he replied, "I'd sit by the Merced River and cry."

Besides interpreting for visitors, Sharsmith did basic research on the alpine meadows of the High Sierra, gathering thousands of herbarium specimens, and publishing several research papers.

Sharsmith's last season as a park ranger-naturalist was at Tuolumne Meadows in Yosemite National Park, age 91 during the summer of 1994; the eldest active NPS park ranger at the time.

== Personal life ==
Helen K. Sharsmith, his wife, was a biologist and botanist with a Ph.D. from UC Berkeley. They had a son John, named after John Muir, and a daughter Linnea, named after Carl Linnaeus. Sharsmith and his wife later divorced.

His interests included botany, zoology, geology, classical music, Shakespeare, and singing opera.

Carl Sharsmith died 1994 in his home at San Jose, California.

== Awards ==
- National Park Service Meritorious Service Award in 1956, the highest award for an NPS employee
- Yosemite Award in 1990, as the first recipient, recognized the "rich legacy he has given this park."

== Legacy ==
- Carl W. Sharsmith Herbarium at San José State University.
- Sharsmith's stickseed (Hackelia sharsmithii) — named for him by I.M. Johnston, but discovered by Sharsmith and his wife Helen Sharsmith at Mirror Lake after climbing Mount Whitney
- Sharsmith's draba (Draba sharsmithii), or Mount Whitney draba (Rollins and R.A. Price) — endemic to southern Sierra Crest in Mount Whitney area.
- Sharsmith Peak, informal name for Peak 12002 in Yosemite National Park, and proposed official name.

== See also ==
- O'Neill, Elizabeth Stone, Mountain Sage: The Life of Carl Sharsmith Yosemite Ranger/Naturalist 2d ed. (1996) ISBN 0-939666-47-2.
- Sharsmith, John and Allan Shields, Climb Every Mountain: A Portrait of Carl Sharsmith by (1996). ISBN 1-882803-12-4.
- Boyer, David S., "Yosemite--Forever?," National Geographic, 167(1):52- (January, 1985). Includes photos and text about Sharsmith.
- Neeley, Will, "Dr. Carl W. 'Zeke' Sharsmith," Yosemite Nature Notes, 46(2):76-80 (August 1977)
- Bingaman, John, "Dr. Carl Sharsmith", Guardians of the Yosemite (1961)
