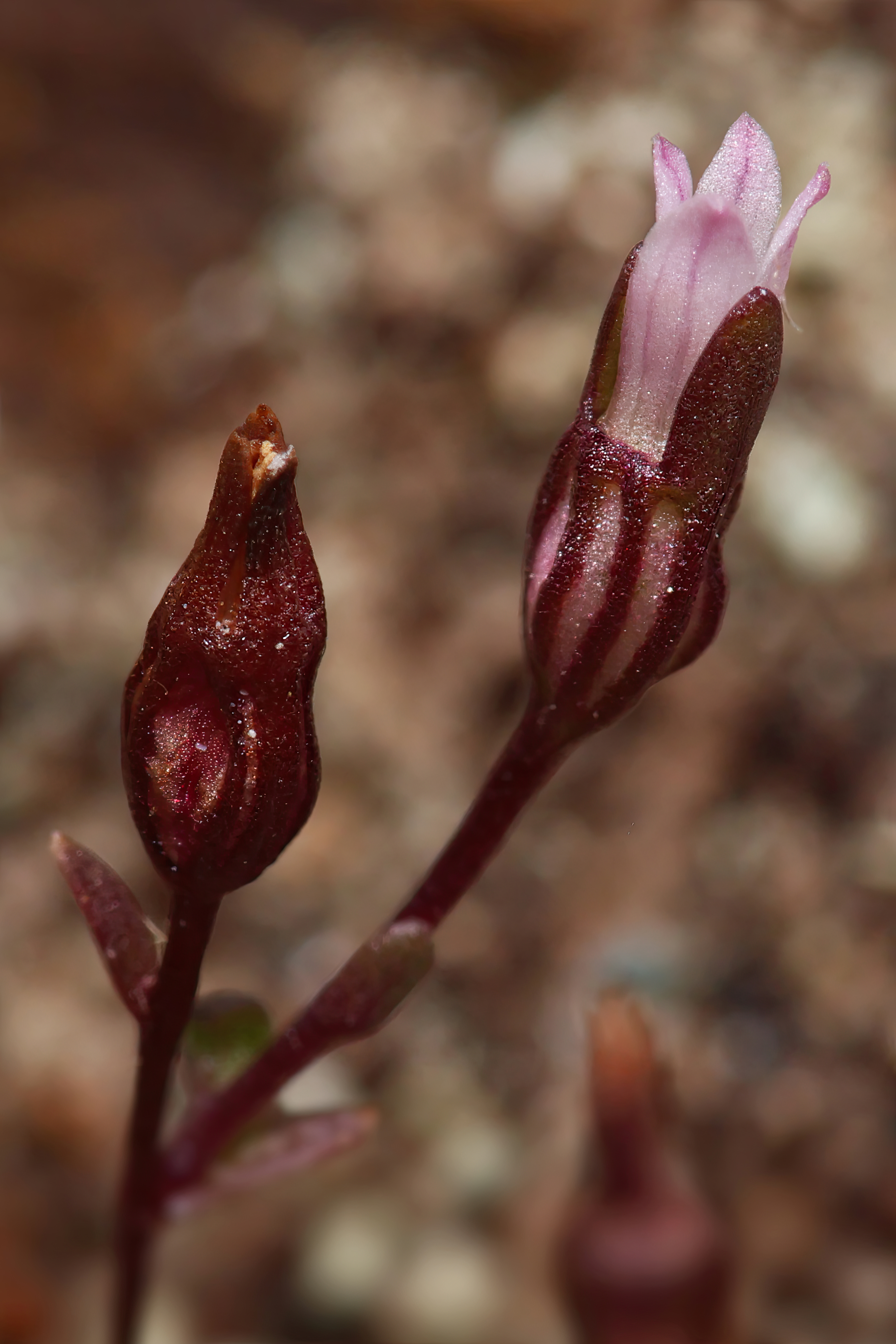
- Ravenella griffinii

Scientific classification
- Kingdom: Plantae
- Clade: Tracheophytes
- Clade: Angiosperms
- Clade: Eudicots
- Clade: Asterids
- Order: Asterales
- Family: Campanulaceae
- Subfamily: Campanuloideae
- Genus: Ravenella; Morin (2020)

Species
- Ravenella angustiflora (Eastw.) Morin; Ravenella exigua (Rattan) Morin; Ravenella griffinii (Morin) Morin; Ravenella sharsmithiae (Morin) Morin

= Ravenella =

Genus of flowering plants

Ravenella is a genus of plants in family Campanulaceae. It includes four species endemic to California.

- Ravenella angustiflora (Eastw.) Morin
- Ravenella exigua (Rattan) Morin
- Ravenella griffinii (Morin) Morin
- Ravenella sharsmithiae (Morin) Morin
