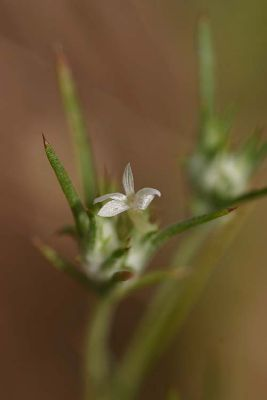

Scientific classification
- Kingdom: Plantae
- Clade: Embryophytes
- Clade: Tracheophytes
- Clade: Angiosperms
- Clade: Eudicots
- Clade: Asterids
- Order: Ericales
- Family: Polemoniaceae
- Genus: Eriastrum
- Species: E. hooveri

Binomial name
- Eriastrum hooveri (Jeps.) H.Mason

= Eriastrum hooveri =

Species of flowering plant

Eriastrum hooveri is a rare species of flowering plant in the phlox family known by the common name Hoover's woollystar. It is endemic to the South Coast Ranges of California from San Benito to Los Angeles Counties, where it grows in grassy open habitat. It is an annual herb producing a wiry, usually woolly stem up to about 15 centimeters tall. The leaves are linear and threadlike, less than three centimeters long, and sometimes divided into two thready lobes. The inflorescence is a woolly cluster of narrow, leaflike bracts laced with webby fibers. The flowers are white and just a few millimeters in length.

This plant was considered to be in serious jeopardy in the 1980s when many of its populations, most of which occurred on private and unprotected land, were in immediate danger of being destroyed by one or more threats, including conversion of the land for agricultural use, petroleum drilling, development for housing, grazing, agricultural pollution, invasive plants, flooding, and fire suppression. The plant was federally listed as a threatened species in 1990. After the listing, further studies revealed many more populations, including several in counties where it was not previously known. The species may have been sparse during the 1980s surveys due to drought conditions. The plant was also found to be more adaptable and resilient to destruction than previously thought. Several companies that own land where the plant occurs, such as that in the Lost Hills Oil Field, have put protection measures in place. Based on these events, which demonstrated the plant was not as threatened as was feared, it was delisted in 2003. It is still designated a sensitive species by the Bureau of Land Management.
