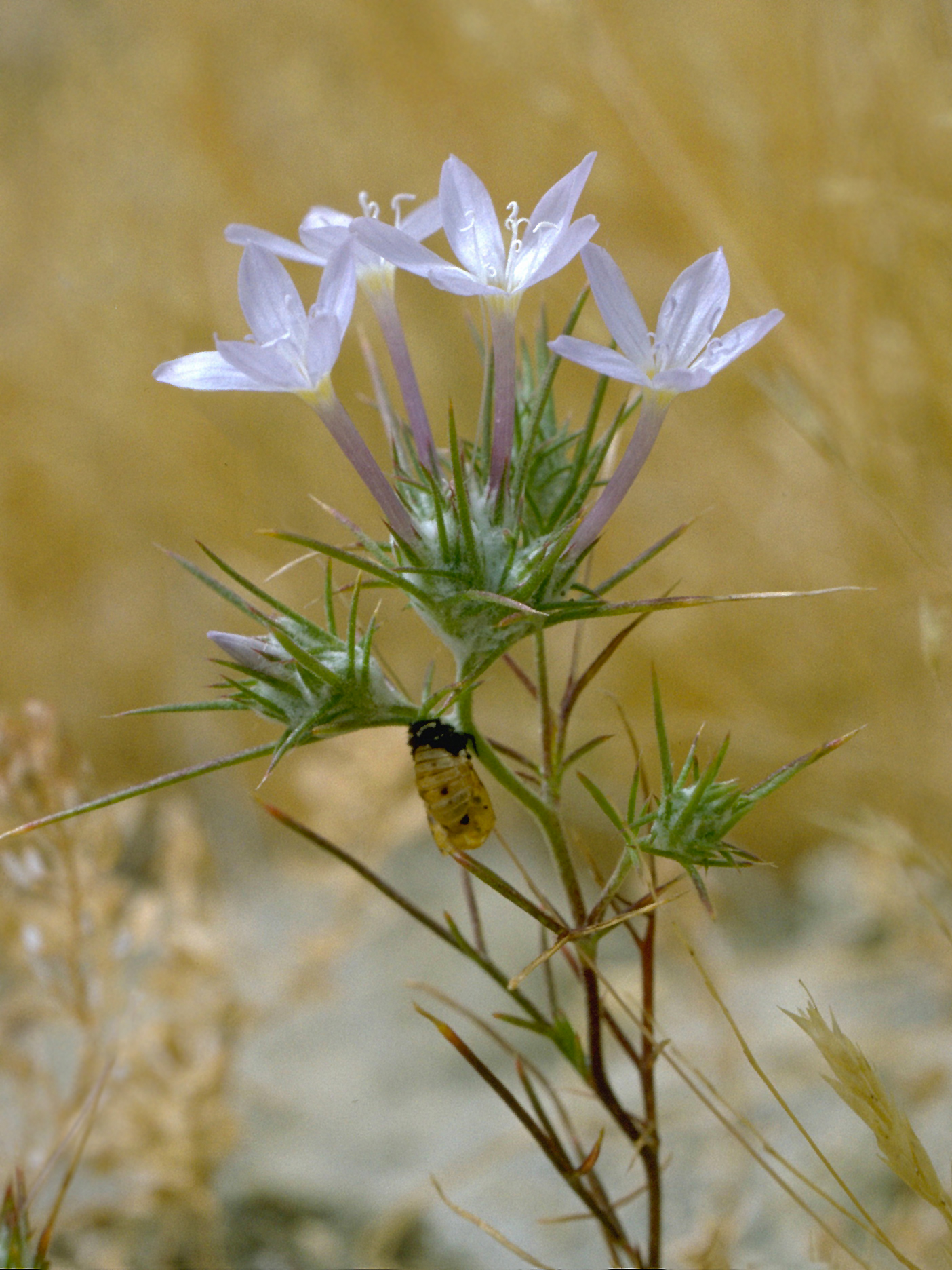

Scientific classification
- Kingdom: Plantae
- Clade: Tracheophytes
- Clade: Angiosperms
- Clade: Eudicots
- Clade: Asterids
- Order: Ericales
- Family: Polemoniaceae
- Genus: Eriastrum
- Species: E. pluriflorum

Binomial name
- Eriastrum pluriflorum (A.Heller) H. Mason

= Eriastrum pluriflorum =

Species of flowering plant

Eriastrum pluriflorum is a species of flowering plant in the phlox family known by the common names Tehachapi woollystar and many-flowered eriastrum.

== Distribution ==
This wildflower is endemic to California where it is an uncommon resident of varied chaparral and woodland habitats in the central part of the state from the Inner South California Coast Ranges and northwestern Transverse Ranges, across the San Joaquin Valley to the Sierra Nevada and Tehachapi Mountains, and into the western Mojave Desert.

== Description ==
This is a small annual plant, Eriastrum pluriflorum, which may be anywhere from 2 to 25 centimeters in height, forming an erect bunch or a small patch on the ground. Its stem has the occasional narrow, thready leaf a few centimeters in length and coated in woolly hairs.

The inflorescence is a mass of spindly bracts strung thickly with dense, cobwebby wool and bearing many distinctive trumpet-shaped flowers. Each flower has a very narrow throat tube one to two centimeters long ending in a flat faced corolla. The centimeter-wide corolla has five rounded to diamond-shaped lobes which are bright lavender to blue. The throat of the flower may be the same color or yellowish to reddish. The light-colored stamens protrude from the corolla.

=== Subspecies ===
Subspecies include:

- Eriastrum pluriflorum ssp. pluriflorum
- Eriastrum pluriflorum ssp. sherman-hoytiae — Many flowered eriastrum — endemic to the Mojave Desert.
