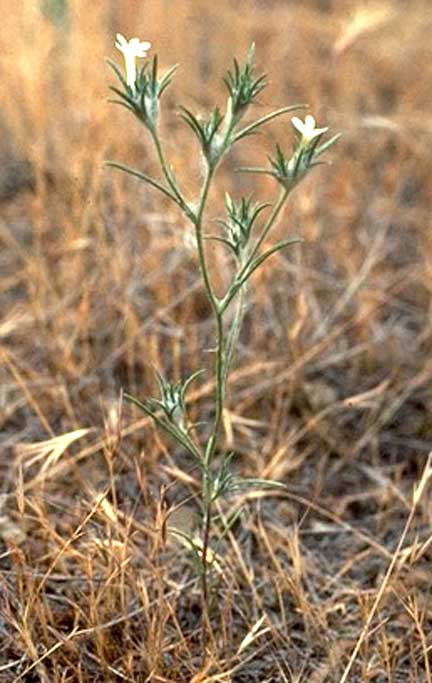

Conservation status
- Critically Imperiled (NatureServe)

Scientific classification
- Kingdom: Plantae
- Clade: Tracheophytes
- Clade: Angiosperms
- Clade: Eudicots
- Clade: Asterids
- Order: Ericales
- Family: Polemoniaceae
- Genus: Eriastrum
- Species: E. brandegeeae

Binomial name
- Eriastrum brandegeeae H.Mason

Synonyms
- Eriastrum tracyi

= Eriastrum brandegeeae =

Species of flowering plant

Eriastrum brandegeeae is a species of flowering plant in the phlox family known by the common name Brandegee's woollystar. It is endemic to California, where it is known from the chaparral and woodlands of the North Coast Ranges, generally on volcanic soils. There have been specimens collected from the San Francisco Bay Area which are closer to this species than other Eriastrum, but may actually be a new species. This is an annual herb producing a thin, usually woolly stem up to about 30 centimeters tall. The leaves are divided into several narrow, threadlike linear lobes. The inflorescence is a woolly cluster of narrow, leaflike bracts laced with webby fibers. The small flowers have white to light blue corollas.
