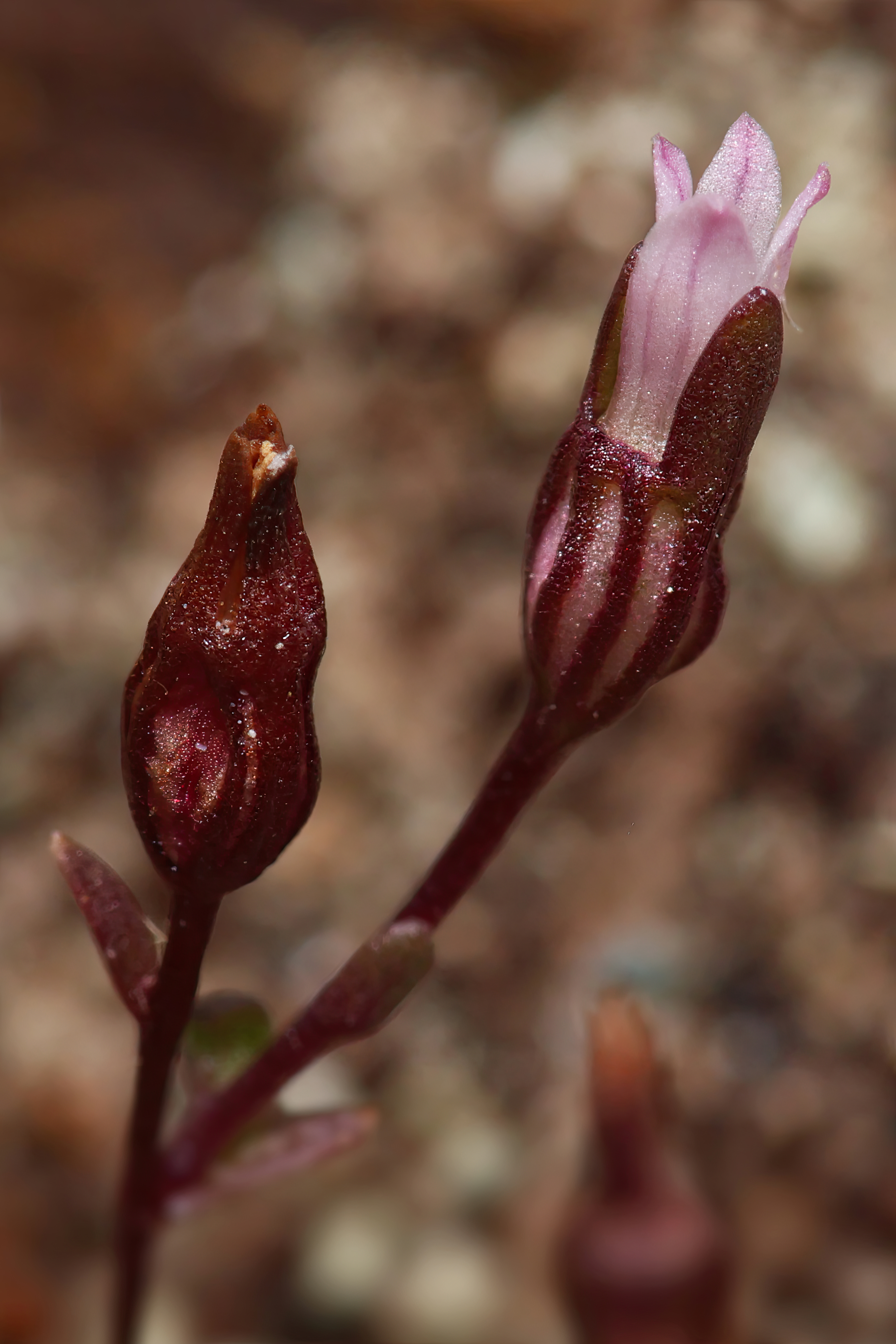

Conservation status
- Vulnerable (NatureServe)

Scientific classification
- Kingdom: Plantae
- Clade: Tracheophytes
- Clade: Angiosperms
- Clade: Eudicots
- Clade: Asterids
- Order: Asterales
- Family: Campanulaceae
- Genus: Ravenella
- Species: R. griffinii

Binomial name
- Ravenella griffinii (Morin) Morin (2020)

Synonyms
- Campanula angustiflora var. exilis J.T.Howell (1938); Campanula griffinii Morin (1980)

= Ravenella griffinii =

Species of flowering plant

Ravenella griffinii is a species of bellflower known by the common name Griffin's bellflower. It is endemic to California, where it grows in the North and Central Coast Ranges in chaparral habitat on serpentine soils. This is an annual herb producing a thin, erect stem up to 20 centimeters tall. The leathery leaves are linear in shape, toothed along the edges, and less than a centimeter long. The stem and foliage are sometimes reddish in color and may have stiff hairs. The small, cylindrical flower is pale blue to white and less than 4 millimeters long. The fruit is an oblong, ribbed capsule.
