= Allium sharsmithiae =

Conservation status
- Imperiled (NatureServe)

Scientific classification
- Kingdom: Plantae
- Clade: Tracheophytes
- Clade: Angiosperms
- Clade: Monocots
- Order: Asparagales
- Family: Amaryllidaceae
- Subfamily: Allioideae
- Genus: Allium
- Species: A. sharsmithiae

Binomial name
- Allium sharsmithiae (Ownbey & Aase ex Traub) McNeal

SynonymsTropicos, Allium fimbriatum var. sharsmithiae Ownbey & Aase ex Traub
- Allium fimbriatum var. sharsmithae Ownbey & Aase in Munz & Keck 1959, invalid, no Latin description; Allium fimbriatum var. sharsmithiae Ownbey & Aase ex Traub 1972

Species of flowering plant

Allium sharsmithiae, called the Mount Hamilton onion or Helen Sharsmith's onion, is a rare species of wild onion endemic to a small region in California. It is found on serpentine soils in the vicinity of Mount Hamilton, in the Diablo Range south of San Francisco Bay in Santa Clara, Alameda and Stanislaus Counties.

== Description ==
Allium sharsmithiae produces round to egg-shaped bulbs up to 2 cm in diameter. Flowering stalk is round in cross section, not hollow, up to 20 cm tall. Flowers are urn-shaped, up to 2 cm in diameter; tepals deep reddish-purple; anthers and pollen yellow.
