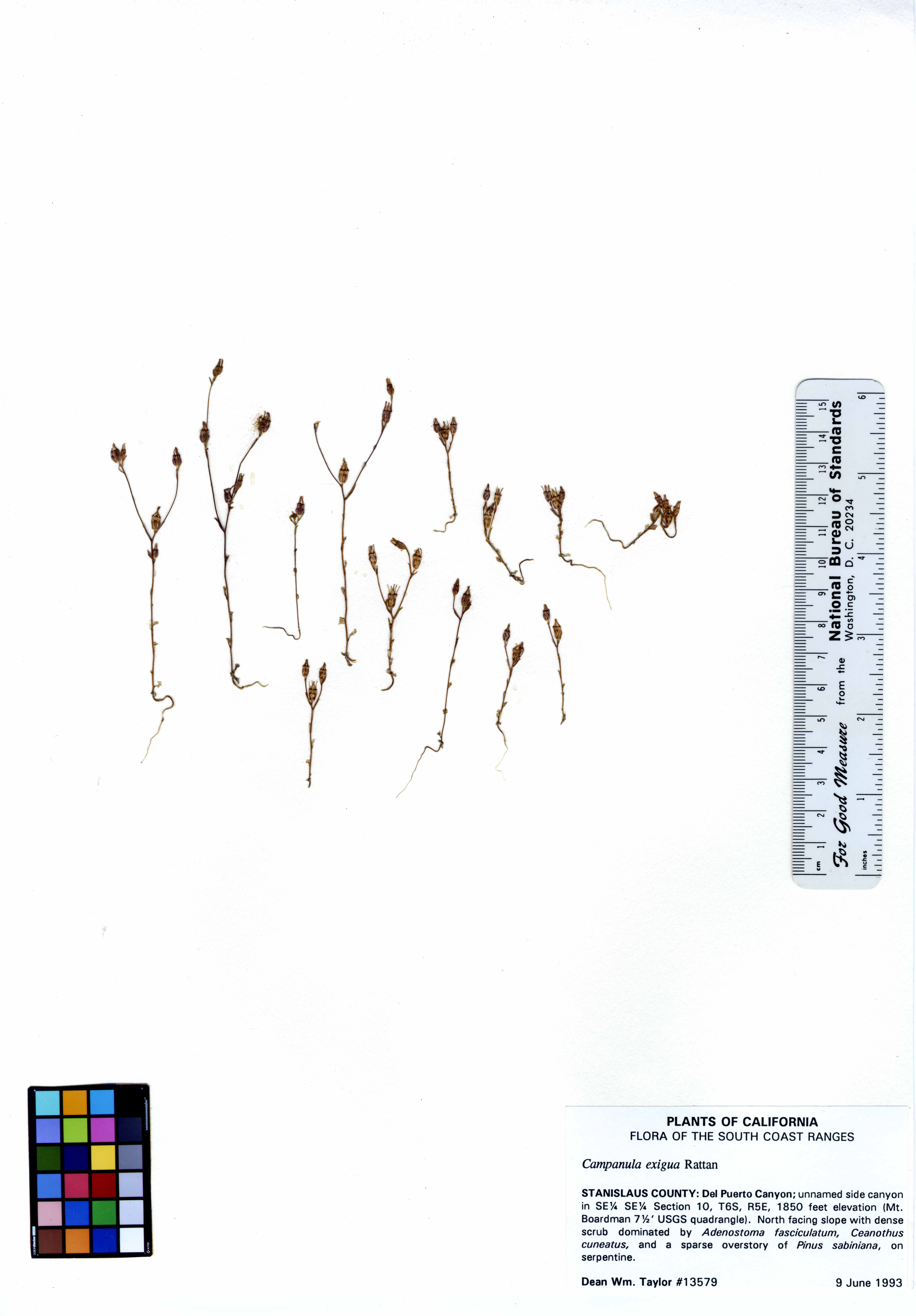

Conservation status
- Imperiled (NatureServe)

Scientific classification
- Kingdom: Plantae
- Clade: Embryophytes
- Clade: Tracheophytes
- Clade: Spermatophytes
- Clade: Angiosperms
- Clade: Eudicots
- Clade: Asterids
- Order: Asterales
- Family: Campanulaceae
- Genus: Ravenella
- Species: R. exigua

Binomial name
- Ravenella exigua (Rattan) Morin (2020)

Synonyms
- Campanula exigua Rattan (1886)

= Ravenella exigua =

Species of flowering plant in the bellflower family

Ravenella exigua, the chaparral bellflower, rock harebell, or Rattan campanula, is an annual flowering plant in the bellflower family Campanulaceae.

== Distribution ==
The plant is endemic to Mount Diablo, in the northern Diablo Range within Contra Costa County, in the East Bay region of northern California.

As its common name suggests, chaparral bellflower is a member of the chaparral ecosystem, growing primarily in serpentine soils at elevations of 300–1,250 metres (980–4,100 ft). It grows amongst other Mount Diablo and regional endemic plants, all dependent on natural fire ecology conditions.

== Description ==
Ravenella exigua sends up several long stems filled with milky sap and bearing sparse, tiny leaves.

At the end of each stem blooms a bell-shaped bright blue-violet flower. The bloom period is May and June.
