= Ravenella angustiflora =

Conservation status
- Imperiled (NatureServe)

Scientific classification
- Kingdom: Plantae
- Clade: Tracheophytes
- Clade: Angiosperms
- Clade: Eudicots
- Clade: Asterids
- Order: Asterales
- Family: Campanulaceae
- Genus: Ravenella
- Species: R. angustiflora

Binomial name
- Ravenella angustiflora (Eastw.) Morin (2020)

Synonyms
- Campanula angustiflora Eastw. (1897)

Species of flowering plant in the bellflower family

Ravenella angustiflora is a species of flowering plant in the bellflower family Campanulaceae. It is known by the common name Eastwood's bellflower. It is endemic to California, where it grows in the serpentine soils of the hills and mountains surrounding the San Francisco Bay Area. It is a flower of the chaparral plant community. This is a hairy annual herb producing a thin, branching stem up to 20 centimeters (8 in) tall. The leaves are leathery in texture and oval in shape, measuring between 0.5 and 1 centimeter (0.2 and 0.4 in) in length, with a few teeth along the edges. The bell-shaped flower is pale blue or white and just a few millimeters long. The fruit is a ribbed, spherical capsule.
