= Draba sharsmithii =

Conservation status
- Critically Imperiled (NatureServe)

Scientific classification
- Kingdom: Plantae
- Clade: Tracheophytes
- Clade: Angiosperms
- Clade: Eudicots
- Clade: Rosids
- Order: Brassicales
- Family: Brassicaceae
- Genus: Draba
- Species: D. sharsmithii

Binomial name
- Draba sharsmithii Rollins & R.A.Price

Species of flowering plant

Draba sharsmithii is an uncommon species of flowering plant in the family Brassicaceae known by the common names Mt. Whitney draba and Sharsmith's draba.

== Description ==
Draba sharsmithii is a small perennial herb forming dense mats or cushions of hairy, oval-shaped leaves each no more than a centimeter long. The erect inflorescence bears several yellow flowers. The fruit is a twisted, lance-shaped silique up to 2 centimeters long containing several unwinged seeds.

== Distribution ==
Draba sharsmithii is endemic to the southern Sierra Nevada of California, where it is known from fewer than ten occurrences in rocky alpine and subalpine habitat.

== See also ==
- Carl Sharsmith
