= Ethel Katherine Crum =

American botanist and editor (1886–1943)

- Born: March 13, 1886; Lexington, Illinois
- Died: January 5, 1943 (aged 56); Lexington, Illinois
- Education: University of Illinois, University of California, Berkeley
- Scientific career
- Workplaces: University Herbarium at UC Berkeley

Ethel Katherine Crum (March 13, 1886 - January 5, 1943) was an American botanist, noted for collecting and studying California flora, as well as serving as assistant curator of the University of California Herbarium. She discovered and formally described at least 13 species and varieties of plants. She obtained her M.S. in 1929 at the University of California, Berkeley after which she assisted Willis Linn Jepson with the second volume of A Flora of California while working as his research assistant. The standard author abbreviation Crum is used to indicate this person as the author when citing a botanical name.
