= Eriastrum luteum =

Conservation status
- Imperiled (NatureServe)

Scientific classification
- Kingdom: Plantae
- Clade: Tracheophytes
- Clade: Angiosperms
- Clade: Eudicots
- Clade: Asterids
- Order: Ericales
- Family: Polemoniaceae
- Genus: Eriastrum
- Species: E. luteum

Binomial name
- Eriastrum luteum (Benth.) H. Mason

Species of flowering plant

Eriastrum luteum is a species of flowering plant in the phlox family known by the common names yellow woollystar and yellow-flowered eriastrum. This wildflower is endemic to California where it is known only from Monterey and San Luis Obispo Counties. This is a small annual rarely reaching the maximum 25 centimeters in height. It has occasional thin, threadlike leaves which are covered in a coat of woolly hairs. The inflorescence is a cluster of leaflike green or reddish bracts strung densely with cobwebby white wool and bearing bright yellow flowers. Each flower has five rounded lobes and long, protruding stamens with large anthers.
