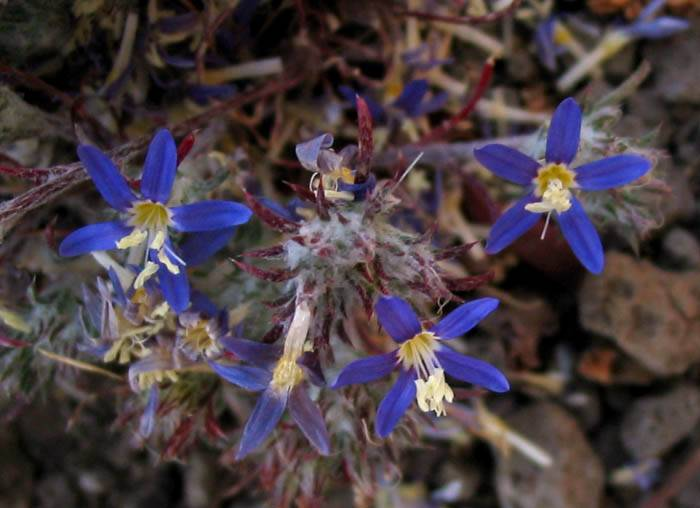

Conservation status
- Vulnerable (NatureServe)

Scientific classification
- Kingdom: Plantae
- Clade: Tracheophytes
- Clade: Angiosperms
- Clade: Eudicots
- Clade: Asterids
- Order: Ericales
- Family: Polemoniaceae
- Genus: Eriastrum
- Species: E. sapphirinum

Binomial name
- Eriastrum sapphirinum (Eastw.) H. Mason

= Eriastrum sapphirinum =

Species of flowering plant

Eriastrum sapphirinum is a species of flowering plant in the phlox family known by the common name sapphire woollystar. This wildflower is endemic to California where it is found in many habitats throughout the state. It is an annual reaching anywhere from 5 to 40 centimeters in height, forming clumps or singular spindly stems. The stem is erect and may be reddish to green, and has the occasional threadlike leaf with a texture ranging from sparse hairs to a coat of dense wool. The inflorescences at the tips of the stems are packed with pointed, leaflike green to red bracts and funnel-shaped flowers. The corolla of the flower has five lobes each one half to one centimeter long and pale to bright blue. The throat of the flower is the same color or yellowish to white. At the mouth of the tube there may be dots of yellow and white. The light colored stamens protrude.
