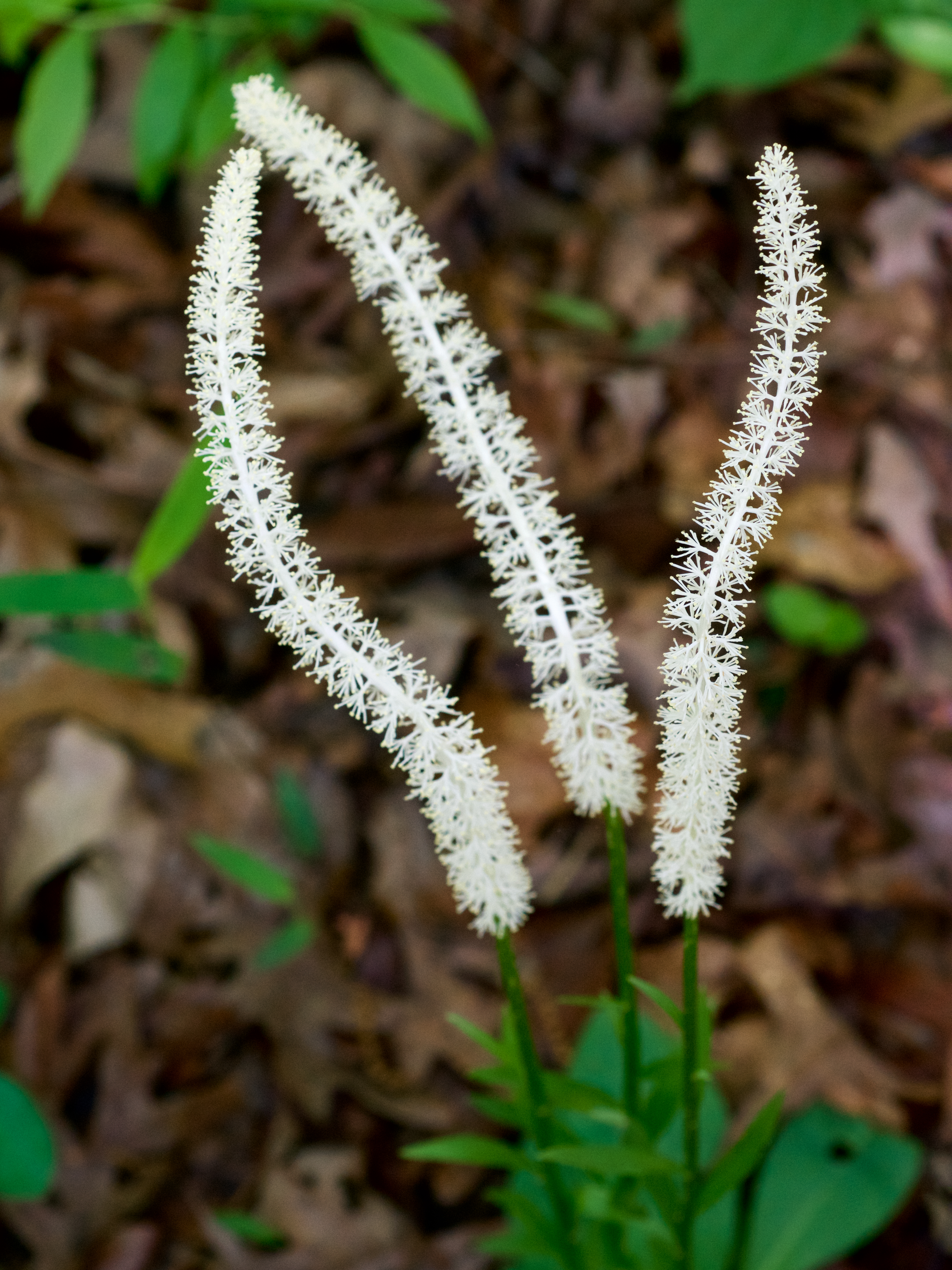
- Inflorescence

Conservation status
- Secure (NatureServe)

Scientific classification
- Kingdom: Plantae
- Clade: Embryophytes
- Clade: Tracheophytes
- Clade: Angiosperms
- Clade: Monocots
- Order: Liliales
- Family: Melanthiaceae
- Tribe: Chionographideae
- Genus: Chamaelirium
- Species: C. luteum

Binomial name
- Chamaelirium luteum (L.) Gray

Synonyms
- List: Abalon albiflorum Raf.; Chamaelirium carolinianum Willd.; Chamaelirium luteum Miq. nom. illeg.; Chamaelirium obovale Small; Chionographis lutea (L.) Baill.; Dasurus luteus (L.) Salisb. nom. inval.; Diclinotrys albiflorum Raf.; Helonias dioica (Walter) Pursh; Helonias lutea (L.) Ker Gawl.; Helonias pumila Jacq.; Melanthium dioicum Walter; Melanthium luteum (L.) Thunb.; Ophiostachys virginica Delile; Siraitos luteus (L.) F.T.Wang & Tang; Veratrum flavum Herb. ex Schult. & Schult.f.; Veratrum luteum L.

= Chamaelirium luteum =

Genus of flowering plants

Chamaelirium luteum is a species of flowering plants, commonly known as blazing-star, devil's bit, false unicorn, fairy wand, and helonias. It is a perennial herb native to eastern Northern America. It can be found in a variety of habitats, including wet meadows and deciduous woodlands.

Chamaelirium luteum has a basal rosette of around six 8–15 cm leaves, from which a single spike-like raceme inflorescence (1–1.5 cm diameter, 8–30 cm length) emerges. The plants are generally dioecious, with male-biased gender ratios in a given population. This is due to higher mortality of female plants, and the tendency of female plants to flower less frequently. Female stalks tend to be taller, giving a total maximum plant height of about 1.2 m, but also tend to have about ten times fewer flowers.

Chamaelirium luteum is quite rare at the fringes of its range.

== Distribution ==
Chamaelirium luteum can be found in temperate North America, United States and Canada. It occurs in the east of the Mississippi and it is historically known from southern Ontario.

== Etymology ==
The etymology of Chamaelirium luteum comes from the Greek and means: chamai = "on the ground" and leirion = "lilly", and the Latin luteus = "yellow".

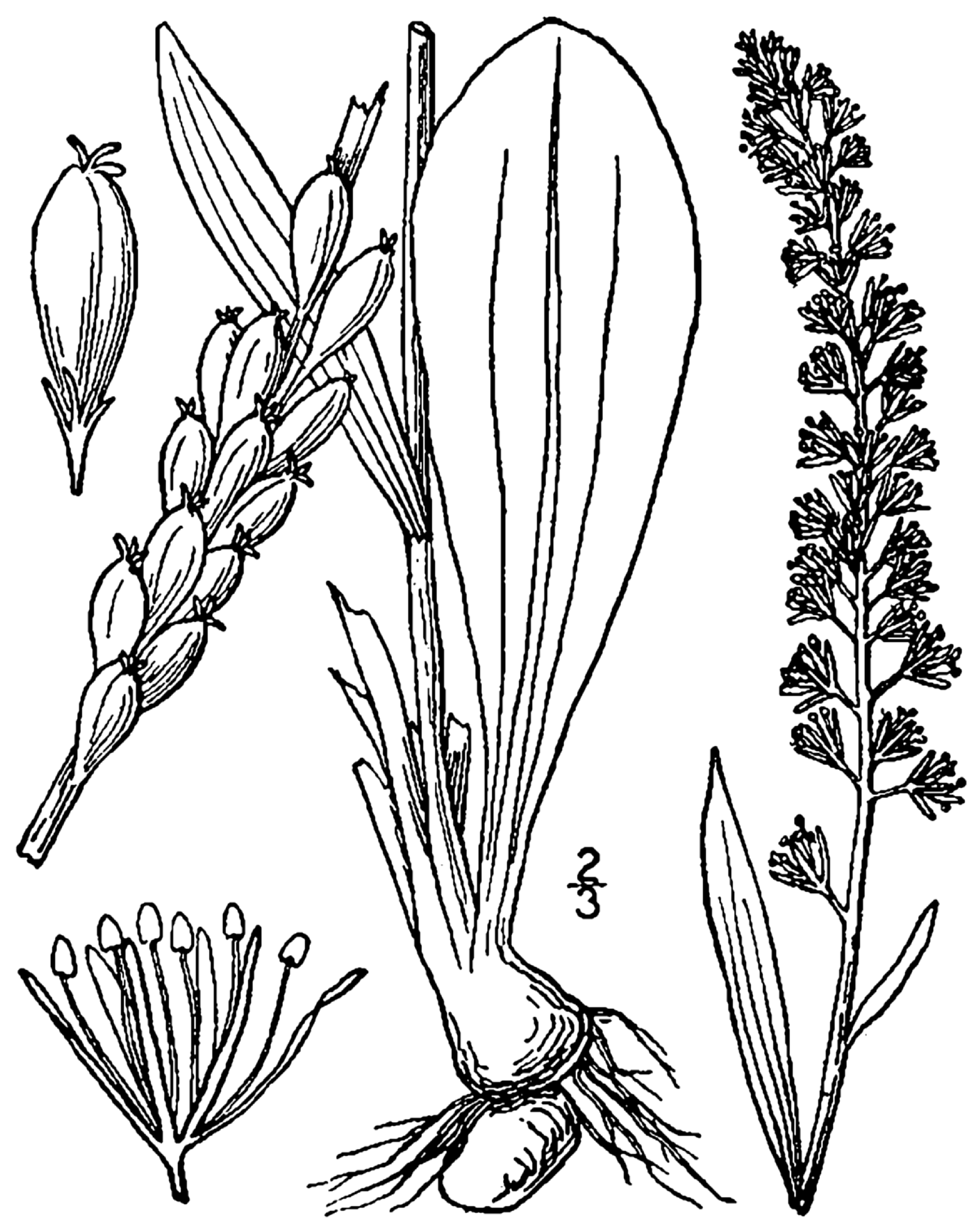
Illustration of Chamaelirium luteum

== Cultivation ==
Because Chamaelirium luteum is normally collected wild, it is at risk of extinction. Cultivation techniques are still under development to satisfy the demand from the market.

=== Site selection ===
Chamaelirium luteum prefers moist, well drained and acidic soil (pH: 4.5 – 6) with a high humus content. In open fields it should be shaded by a shading structure, to protect it from the direct radiation of the sun. For forest cultivation it should be preferably planted in an area with tall hardwood trees.

=== Planting ===
Chamaelirium luteum can be propagated through seeds or root division.

For propagation through root division the rhizomes can be divided by cutting them into pieces of 1/4 inch (6.4 mm). This disc-shaped pieces should be left to callus over night and can be planted in pots on the next day. The soil should be kept moist and shaded until the plants emerge. Young plants can be transplanted in a well prepared growing bed with a high organic matter in a planting distance of 6–10 inches (15–25 centimetres). To support the plants with nutrients, pine needles, rotted conifer-derived sawdust or bark mulch should be added to the top soil.

For propagation through seeds, the seeds should be sown in late Fall or early Winter to a depth of 1/8 inch (3.2 mm) in breeding beds with high humus content. For a good germination the seed should go through stratification. The plants grow best in soil mixture of peat moss and decomposed pine needles. When the young plants emerge they should be left in undisturbed at least for one growing season. Then they can be transplanted as for the propagation method through root division.

=== Maintenance ===
The plant should be moist and shaded and protected from herbivory by snails and slugs or deer in woods. Weeds should always be removed.

== Uses ==
Chamaelirium luteum is used as ornamental or medical herb. Historically it has been used widely by Indigenous peoples.

It was traditionally used to prevent miscarriages and it has the reputation of improving fertility.

The rhizomes can be harvested after six years. This is done in fall after collecting the mature seeds. After removing the soil and the roots from other plants, the rhizome should be stored unwashed until further processing. It should be prevented from drying out and also from too high moisture, which could lead to mold infestation. Before processing, the rhizome should be washed carefully.

=== Bioactive components ===
The bioactive components are a mixture of steroidal saponins, including chamaelirin and aglycone diosgenin. These bioactive substances act as an emmenagogue, diuretic and emetic.
