= Herbert Louis Mason =

American botanist (1896–1994)

- Born: January 3, 1896; Fond du Lac, Wisconsin
- Died: March 26, 1994 (aged 98); Bellingham, Washington
- Education: Stanford University; University of California, Berkeley
- Known for: A Flora of the Marshes of California (1957)
- Scientific career
- Fields: Botany; Plant biosystematics Phytogeography
- Workplaces: University of California, Berkeley; Jepson Herbarium
- Thesis: A Pleistocene flora from the Tomales Bay region and its bearing on the history of the coastal pine forests of California
- Doctoral advisor: Willis L. Jepson
- Doctoral students: Charles Bixler Heiser; Robert Ornduff
- Author abbrev. (botany): H.Mason

Herbert Louis (né Lewis) Mason (1896–1994) was an American botany professor, plant collector, and herbarium director.

After graduating from high school, Herbert Mason and his identical twin brother, Walter, matriculated (passed entrance requirements) at Stanford University. Their education was interrupted when they both volunteered for military service in WWI and served in a U.S. Army hospital in Beaune, France. After the end of the war, Herbert Mason returned to Stanford University and received his bachelor's degree there in 1921. He became a graduate student at the University of California, Berkeley (U.C. Berkeley) and received an M.A. there in 1923. From 1923 to 1925 he taught at Mills College. From 1925 to 1931 Mason was employed as an associate in Willis L. Jepson's Phenogamic Laboratory.

In 1932 he received his Ph.D. from U.C. Berkeley. His thesis committee consisted of Willis L. Jepson (as committee chair), Ralph Works Chaney, and Charles Lewis Camp. In 1932 Mason participated in an expedition to the Bering Sea and the Arctic Ocean. At Jepson Herbarium and jointly in U.C. Berkeley's botany department, Mason was appointed in 1933 assistant curator and instructor, in 1934 associate curator and assistant professor, in 1938 (full) curator and associate professor, and in 1941 herbarium director and (full) professor, retiring in 1963 with emeritus status. The years of Mason's directorship were a time of rapid growth for Jepson Herbarium. From 1935 to 1963 he was a member of the board of editors of the journal Madroño, where he was assisted for many years by Annetta Mary Carter, Ethel Katherine Crum, and Helen Sharsmith.

In 1949 he became one of the founders of the Regional Parks Association, which has the stated goal of protecting natural resources in the East Bay region of the San Francisco Bay Area.

In 1949 and 1950, Mason joined A. H. Miller and R. A. Stirton in an expedition to the Magdalena Basin of Colombia, sponsored by the Associates in Tropical Biogeography. The objective was to study periodic phenomena under tropical conditions without marked seasons ... The State Division of Fish and Game commissioned a botanical survey of California wetlands carried out by Mason and his graduate students. It culminated in the production of A Flora of the Marshes of California (1957), doubtless his best-known work.

For volume 3 of the 4-volume series Illustrated Flora of the Pacific States by LeRoy Abrams, Mason wrote the section on the phlox family Polemoniaceae (except for the genus Polemonium, which was written by John Fraser Davidson, and the genus Gilia, which Mason wrote jointly with Alva Day Grant). In preparing his manuscript for volume 3, Mason found that 5 five species of Navarretia were scientifically undescribed.

He collected plants in California, Nevada, Oregon, Arizona, Colombia, and Mexico's Revillagigedo Islands.

Shortly before his retirement, Mason became one of three founders of the Elementary School Science Project, funded by the National Science Foundation and operated out of the Lawrence Hall of Science. He was recalled from retirement to serve as director of this project, which he found richly rewarding, and which has had an important impact on science education in the United States.

In May 1931 in Skagit County, Washington he married Lucile Roush (1896–1986), who was a student along with him at both Stanford and Berkeley. She received her Ph.D. from U. C. Berkeley with a thesis on coralline algae. When he retired in 1963 they moved to Washington state in order to be near their son David Thomas Mason, who was a professor at Western Washington University.
