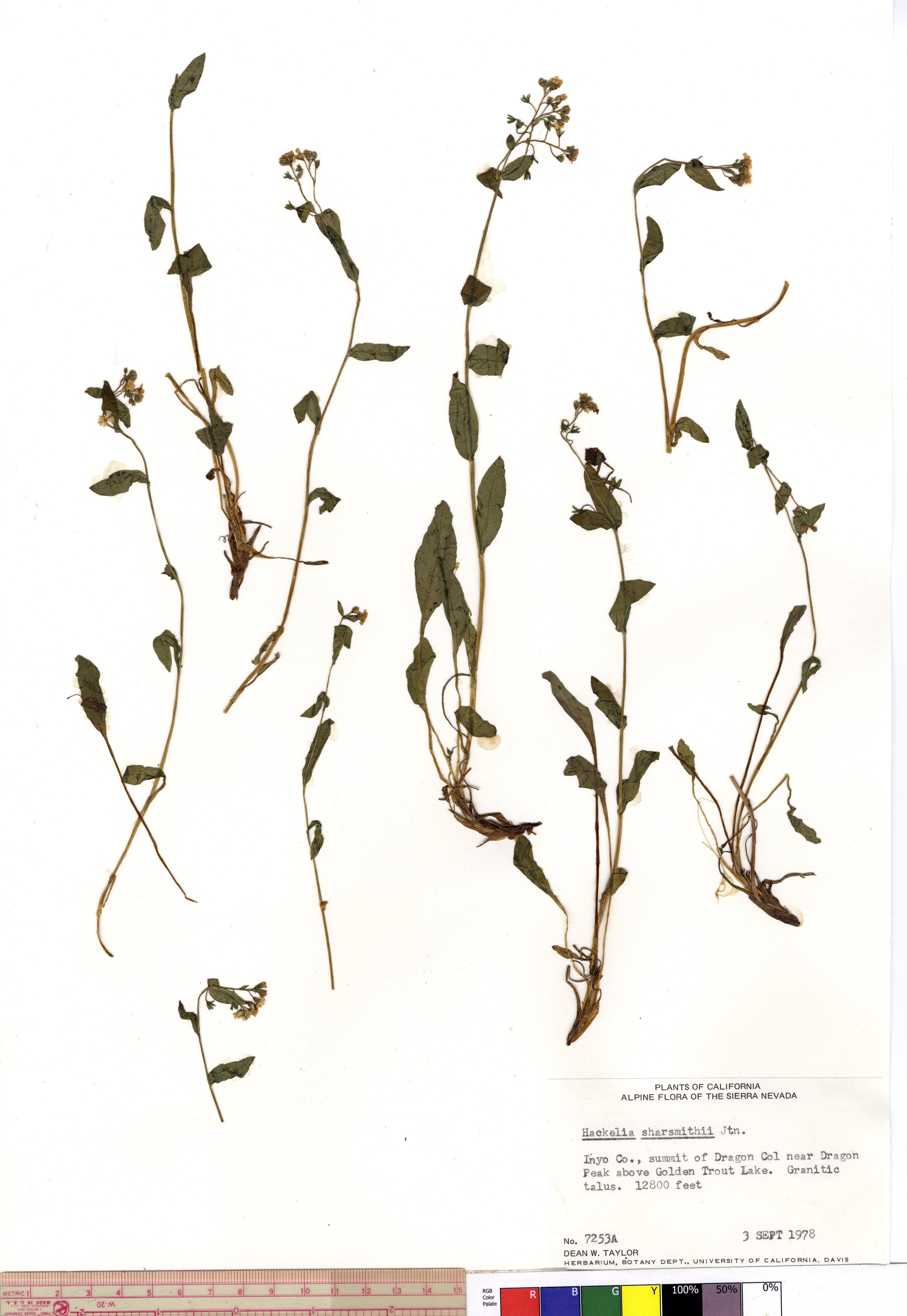

Conservation status
- Imperiled (NatureServe)

Scientific classification
- Kingdom: Plantae
- Clade: Tracheophytes
- Clade: Angiosperms
- Clade: Eudicots
- Clade: Asterids
- Order: Boraginales
- Family: Boraginaceae
- Genus: Hackelia
- Species: H. sharsmithii

Binomial name
- Hackelia sharsmithii I.M.Johnst.

= Hackelia sharsmithii =

Species of flowering plant

Hackelia sharsmithii is a species of flowering plant in the borage family known by the common name Sharsmith's stickseed. It is native to the Sierra Nevada of California, where its range extends along ridges surrounding the intersection of Inyo County and Fresno and Tulare Counties, including Mount Whitney. It is a plant of rocky habitat, such as talus. It is a hairy perennial herb up to about 30 centimeters (12 in) tall. Most of the leaves are located around the base of the plant, reaching up to 14 centimeters (5.5 in) long. Leaves higher on the stem are shorter and narrower. The hairy inflorescence is an open array of branches, each a coiling panicle of light blue flowers. The fruit is a cluster of nutlets, sometimes bearing prickles.
