= Shockley =

Shockley is a surname of English origin, a toponymic for residents of Shocklach village in Cheshire. Notable people with the surname include:

- Ann Allen Shockley, American journalist and author
- Arnie Shockley, American football player and coach
- Bill Shockley, American football player
- Costen Shockley, American baseball player
- Deryk Shockley, American soccer player
- Dolores Cooper Shockley, American pharmacist
- D. J. Shockley, American football player
- Evie Shockley, American poet
- Jim Shockley, American politician
- Josh Shockley, American MMA fighter
- Leonard Shockley, American juvenile criminal
- Marian Shockley, American actress
- M. A. W. Shockley, American general and surgeon
- May Bradford Shockley, American surveyor and painter
- Sam Shockley, American criminal and inmate at Alcatraz
- William Shockley, winner of the Nobel Prize for physics
  - William Shockley (disambiguation), multiple people

== Fictional characters ==
- Detective Ben Shockley, protagonist of the 1977 film The Gauntlet

== See also ==
- Shockley Semiconductor Laboratory
