= William Shockley (disambiguation) =

William Shockley (1910–1989) was an American physicist and Nobel Prize winner for co-inventing the transistor.

William Shockley may also refer to:

- Bill Shockley (1937–1992), American footballer
- William R. Shockley (1918–1945), Medal of Honor recipient
- William Shockley (actor) (born 1963), American actor and musician
- William H. Shockley (1855–1925), American mining engineer and plant collector
