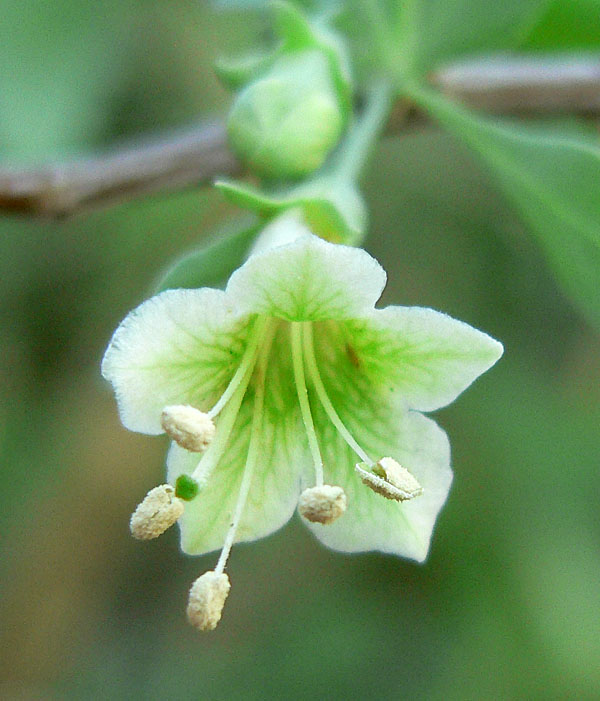

Conservation status
- Secure (NatureServe)

Scientific classification
- Kingdom: Plantae
- Clade: Tracheophytes
- Clade: Angiosperms
- Clade: Eudicots
- Clade: Asterids
- Order: Solanales
- Family: Solanaceae
- Genus: Lycium
- Species: L. pallidum

Binomial name
- Lycium pallidum Miers

Synonyms
- Homotypic Synonyms: Lycium pallidum var. normale A.Terracc.

= Lycium pallidum =

Species of flowering plant

Lycium pallidum is a species of flowering plant in the nightshade family, Solanaceae. It is sometimes referred to by the common names pale wolfberry and pale desert-thorn. It is native to northern Mexico and the southwestern United States. In Mexico it can be found in Sonora, Chihuahua, Zacatecas, and San Luis Potosi. In the United States it occurs in Arizona, California, Colorado, Nevada, New Mexico, Oklahoma, Texas, and Utah.

== Description ==
This shrub grows 1–3 metres (3 ft 3 in – 9 ft 10 in) tall. It is a dense tangle of spiny spreading or erect branches. It can form bushy thickets. The leaves are pale, giving the plant its name. The flowers are solitary or borne in pairs. They are funnel-shaped and "creamy-yellow to yellowish-green" or "greenish cream, sometimes tinged with purple". They are fragrant and pollinated by insects. The fruit is a juicy, oval-shaped, shiny red berry containing up to 50 seeds. The plant reproduces by seed and it can also spread via cuttings, and by suckering and layering.

== Ecology and habitat ==
This plant grows in many types of desert habitat. It occurs in pinyon-juniper woodland, sagebrush, shrubsteppe, savanna, and other ecosystems. It can grow in high-salinity soils. It is characteristic of the flora of the Mojave Desert, and it also occurs in the Sonoran and Chihuahuan Deserts. In the Mojave Desert it grows alongside plants such as winterfat (Krascheninnikovia lanata), Pima rhatany (Krameria erecta), spiny hopsage (Grayia spinosa), Shockley goldenhead (Acamptopappus shockleyi), Frémont's dalea (Psorothamnus fremontii), spiny menodora (Menodora spinescens), and species of ephedra, prickly pear, and yucca. In Arizona it grows in riparian habitat with sycamore (Platanus wrightii), willows (Salix spp.), Arizona walnut (Juglans major), Fremont cottonwood (Populus fremontii), alligator juniper (Juniperus deppeana), Arizona white oak (Quercus arizonica), and velvet ash (Fraxinus velutina). This plant is common around Anasazi ruins; they may have simply collected it and dropped the seeds, but it is possible they cultivated it.

Many types of animals consume the fruits. Phainopepla especially favor it. Woodrats like the foliage.

== Uses ==
Native Americans utilized the plant for a number of medicinal and other purposes. The Navajo used it for toothache. They considered it a sacred plant and sacrificed it to the gods. Several groups used the fruit for food by eating it fresh, cooked, or dried, eating it mixed with clay, boiling it into a syrup, and making it into beverages. Among the Zuni people, the berries are eaten raw when perfectly ripe or boiled and sometimes sweetened. The ground leaves, twigs, and flowers were given to warriors for protection during war.
