= Robert Klark Graham =

American eugenicist and millionaire (1906–1997)

- Born: June 9, 1906; Harbor Springs, Michigan, U.S.
- Died: February 13, 1997 (aged 90); Seattle, Washington, U.S.
- Occupations: Inventor, businessman, eugenicist, author
- Spouse(s): Elizabeth Graeme, Estelle Graham, Marta Ve Everton

Robert Klark Graham (June 9, 1906 – February 13, 1997) was an American eugenicist and businessman who made millions by developing shatterproof plastic eyeglass lenses and who later founded the Repository for Germinal Choice, a sperm bank for geniuses, in the hope of implementing a eugenics program.

Graham created his "Nobel sperm bank" in 1980. Initially, his intent was to obtain sperm only from Nobel laureates, but the scarcity of donors and the low viability of their sperm (because of age) forced Graham to develop a looser set of criteria.

These criteria were numerous and exacting: for example, sperm recipients were required to be married and to have extremely high IQ, though the bank later relaxed this policy so it could recruit athletes for donors as well as scholars.

By 1983, Graham's sperm bank was reputed to have 19 genius repeat donors, including William Bradford Shockley (recipient of the 1956 Nobel Prize in Physics and proponent of eugenics) and two anonymous Nobel Prize in Science winners.

The bank closed in 1999, two years after the death of its founder. A total of 218 children had been born under its auspices.

Graham's overriding goals were the genetic betterment of the human population and the nurture of newly conceived geniuses. This was a form of "positive" eugenics, meant to increase the number of designated "fit" individuals in a population through selective breeding. However, Graham's "genius sperm bank" was highly controversial.

However, due to lack of proper screening techniques, donors and recipients were not always those who met Graham's selective criteria.

In 1991 Graham was awarded the first Ig Nobel prize in biology for his "pioneering development of the Repository for Germinal Choice"

== Publications ==
- Graham, Robert Klark (1970). The Future of Man. Christopher Publishing House. ISBN 978-0815800330.

== See also ==
- List of Ig Nobel Prize winners
