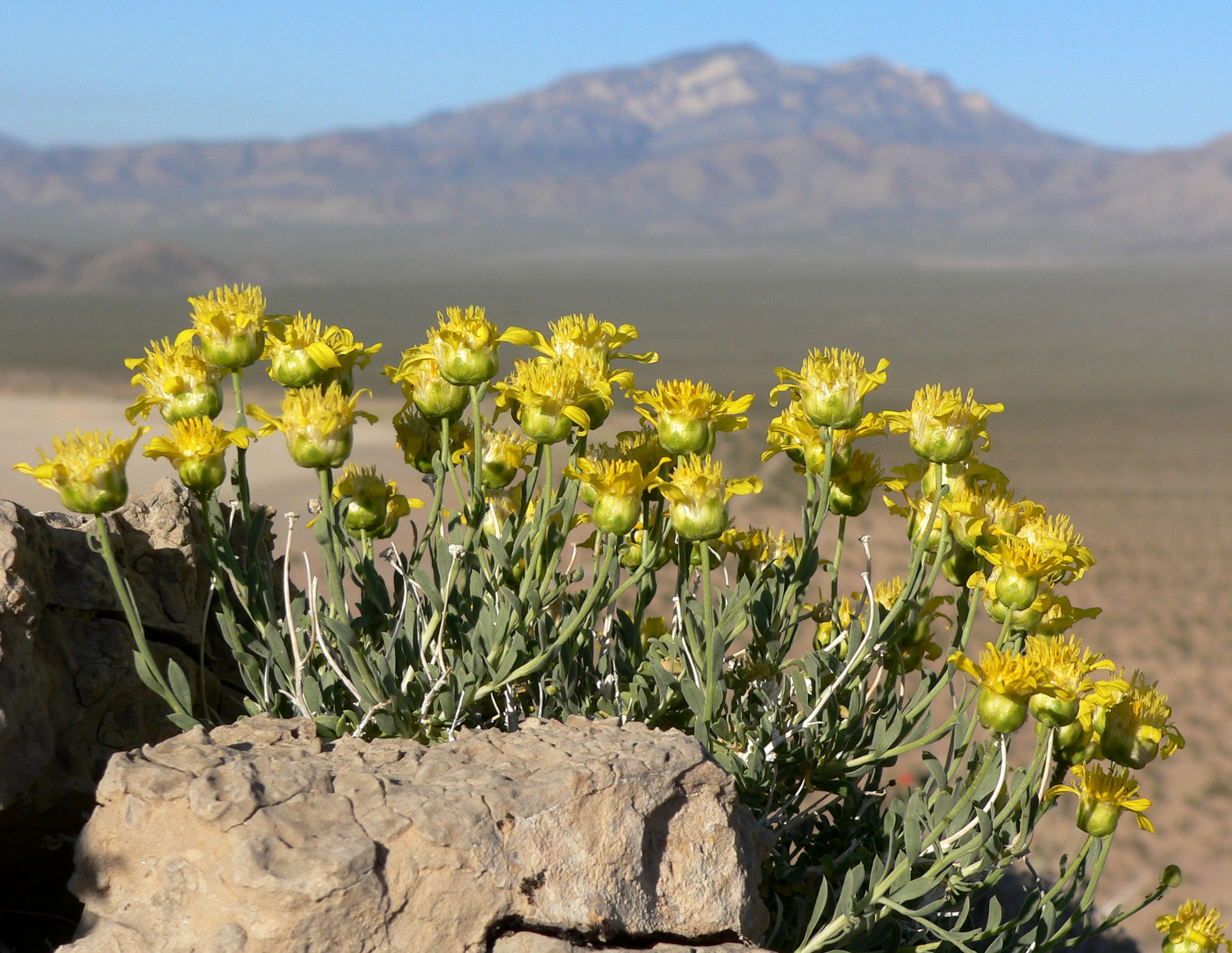

Conservation status
- Vulnerable (NatureServe)

Scientific classification
- Kingdom: Plantae
- Clade: Tracheophytes
- Clade: Angiosperms
- Clade: Eudicots
- Clade: Asterids
- Order: Asterales
- Family: Asteraceae
- Genus: Acamptopappus
- Species: A. shockleyi

Binomial name
- Acamptopappus shockleyi A. Gray
- Range of Acamptoppaus shockleyi

= Acamptopappus shockleyi =

Species of flowering plant

Acamptopappus shockleyi, or Shockley's goldenhead, is a perennial subshrub in the family Asteraceae found in and near the eastern Mojave Desert in southern Nevada and southeastern California.

== Description ==
Acamptopappus shockleyi is a perennial subshrub. Flower heads are borne singly, with both ray flowers and disk flowers, compared to Acamptopappus sphaerocephalus which also grows in the Mojave Desert but has only disc flowers on heads in corymbose arrays.

Acamptopappus shockleyi grows from 3,000 to 6,200 feet (910 to 1,890 m) in flats and washes of the eastern Mojave Desert, White Mountains, Inyo Mountains, and areas of southern Nevada.

== Conservation ==
As of December 2024, the conservation group NatureServe listed Acamptopappus shockleyi as Vulnerable (G3) worldwide. This status was last reviewed on 21 January 1998. At the state level, this species is listed as No Status Rank (not assessed) in California, and Apparently Secure (S4) in Nevada.

== Taxonomy ==
=== Etymology ===
The species is named after William Hillman Shockley.
