= Repository for Germinal Choice =

Former sperm bank in California, US

- Industry: Fertility treatment; Semen cryopreservation
- Founded: 1980; 46 years ago
- Founder: Robert Klark Graham
- Defunct: 1999
- Headquarters: Escondido, California, United States

The Repository for Germinal Choice (originally named the Hermann J. Muller Repository for Germinal Choice, after Nobel laureate Hermann Joseph Muller) was a sperm bank that operated in Escondido, California from 1980 to 1999. The repository is commonly believed to have accepted only donations from recipients of the Nobel Prize, although in fact it accepted donations from non-Nobelists, also. The first baby conceived from the project was a girl born on April 19, 1982. Founded by Robert Klark Graham, the repository was dubbed the "Nobel prize sperm bank" by media reports at the time. The only contributor who became known publicly was William Shockley, Nobel laureate in physics and eugenicist.

== Management ==
Robert Graham managed the bank until his death in February 1997 and the responsibilities were passed to Floyd Kimble, a businessman from Ohio who had shown interest in the bank. At the time of Graham's death, the bank claimed to have produced 217 children, none of whom from sperm donated from Graham's initial focus, Nobel Prize winners. When Kimble died in 1998 the combined relatives of both men decided to close down the bank. All sperm samples were destroyed; it remains unclear what happened to the Repository's records.

== Donors ==
Although most news articles of the time made much of the Repository's "Nobel sperm" standards, in fact the Repository is only known to have stocked the sperm of one Nobelist, William Shockley. Other donors were recruited from among the ranks of scientists and academics Graham and his assistant, Paul Smith, considered to be "the future Nobel laureates".

Graham's initial attempts to recruit Nobel laureates who lived near the Repository yielded only three volunteers, Shockley among them; however, when the news media began reporting on the existence and intentions of the Repository, two of the laureates broke off their ties to Graham and did not donate. Only Shockley remained, and even he donated only once. Paul Smith was charged with recruiting new donors, and he traveled throughout California, focusing mainly on college campuses, in search of volunteers. Smith later estimated his "hit rate" of donors signed up compared to men he invited to be "six or eight, maybe ten" out of one hundred. The search was expanded to country-wide, and eventually more donors were recruited, although none of them were – then or currently – Nobel laureates. At the time of his death, Graham had expanded his requirements to allow athletes, artists, and businessmen as donors.

One donor named Jason Kaiser, known as Orange Red at the repository, was featured in the 2003 documentary along with Paul Kisak. The documentary was entitled Genius Sperm Bank, which the Discovery Channel broadcast in 2004. The documentary briefly touched upon Kaiser's viewpoints at the time, and reunited him with three of the nine children that reputedly had resulted from his donations. Although not a Nobel laureate, Kaiser did achieve a Master of Science degree in cytogenetics and Kisak was in Mensa, Intertel, the CIA and had an MBA and multiple Engineering degrees.

== Recipients ==
As with the repository's criteria to accept sperm donors, its criteria for women to receive sperm from the bank were not as high as initially reported. Rumors that women were required to be members of Mensa were false; in fact, women did not need to meet any particular intellectual requirement. Essentially, any woman who was married, in good health, and not homosexual was accepted; the only women reported to have been refused sperm were "one [woman] who took lithium, [and] another who was obese and diabetic."

== Outcomes ==
Graham's original intention was to monitor the outcomes of children produced through the bank's sperm, and he asked families using the bank's sperm to agree to periodic surveys; however, most recipients showed no interest in sharing information on their children once the procedure was over, and when he sent out a survey to recipient families in the early 1990s, few families responded. Two women who claimed to have been the recipients of repository sperm and to have raised children born of that sperm responded anonymously to a series of articles in Slate in 2001. Both stated that their children were extremely intelligent and healthy.

A later segment of the same Slate article reported on the highlights of the lives of fifteen of the resultant children. Of the fifteen, six reportedly had 4.0 GPAs and two were reported to be "artistically precocious". One child was reported by his parents as a "math-science genius" and another as a "musical whiz". All the children contacted by Slate were in good health, except one, who had what his mother described as a "developmental disability".

== In media ==
Journalist David Plotz wrote several articles on the repository for the online magazine, Slate. Plotz would later write a book about his experiences investigating the repository in the book The Genius Factory: The Curious History of the Nobel Prize Sperm Bank (2005). Moreover, a documentary, which aired on BBC Horizon in 2006, went over the history of the Repository and various statements made by Graham. The program also featured discussion from another donor, University of Central Oklahoma biology professor James Bidlack.

The Big Bang Theory's pilot episode satirizes the repository when Leonard and Sheldon visit the "high-IQ sperm bank," intending to donate specimens, only to leave after Sheldon suffers a moral crisis over committing "genetic fraud" by donating sperm that may not produce the promised genius offspring.

Episode 5 of This is Life with Lisa Ling focused on the sperm bank, interviewing people who donated, people who went to the sperm bank seeking donated sperm, and people who were born as a result.

The German novel Fast genial ("Almost Genius") by Benedict Wells tells the story of a fictitious child produced by the sperm bank, who searches for his biological father.

== See also ==
- Heritability of IQ
- My Uncle Oswald
