= James Bidlack =

American biologist (born 1961)

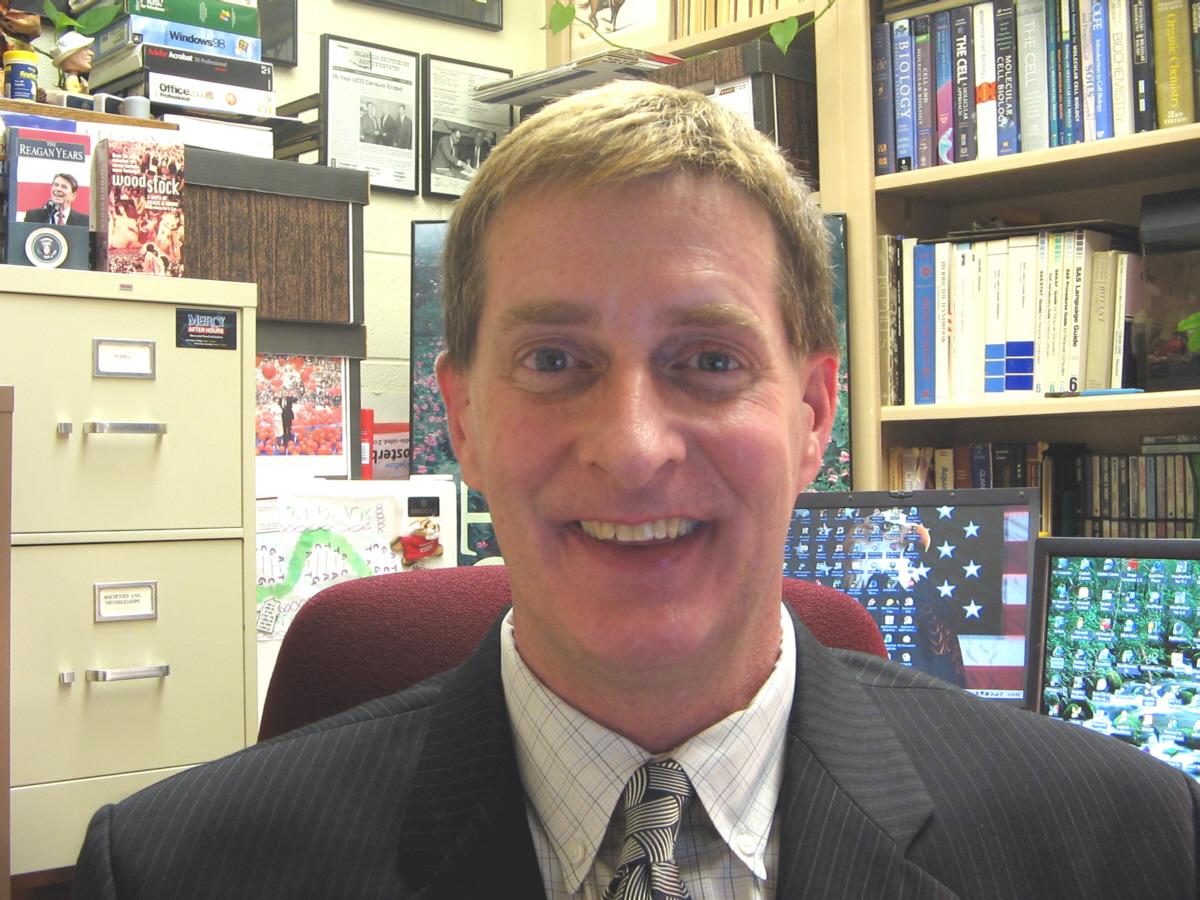
- Born: February 1, 1961 (age 65); Minneapolis, Minnesota, U.S.
- Scientific career
- Fields: Biology

James Enderby Bidlack (born February 1, 1961) is an American biologist and academic. He is a professor of biology and CURE-STEM Scholar at the University of Central Oklahoma, president of Metabolism Foundation and vice president of The Genome Registry. Bidlack has co-written the textbook Introductory Plant Biology over several editions since its ninth edition. He also has been involved with the Repository for Germinal Choice, and appeared in a 2006 documentary about the project. His work is in crop science and plant physiology, with additional involvement in biology education and genetics-related initiatives.

== Early life and education ==
Bidlack was born in Minneapolis, Minnesota, the youngest son of Verne C. and Norma L. Bidlack. His father, Verne C. Bidlack, Jr., contributed to the Manhattan Project during World War II.

He earned a Bachelor of Science degree in soil and crop science from Purdue University in 1984. He completed a Master of Science in crop physiology at the University of Arkansas in 1986 under Charles A. Stutte.

He received a Ph.D. in plant physiology from Iowa State University in 1990 under Dwayne R. Buxton and Richard M. Shibles. His doctoral dissertation, Cell Wall Components and Lignin Biosynthesis in Forages, examined structural and biochemical aspects of plant cell walls.

== Career ==
After completing his doctoral studies, Bidlack joined the University of Central Oklahoma as a faculty member.

At the University of Central Oklahoma, he was hired as an assistant professor in 1990, promoted to associate professor in 1998, and to full professor in 2002.

His research has included work in crop science and plant physiology. His earlier studies examined weed control in pigeon pea and nitrogen content and biomass in legume crop rotations. Later work investigated pigeon pea morphology and physiological responses to water stress. He has also co-authored research on a type IV secretion system in Escherichia coli that increases sensitivity to bile salts.

Bidlack serves as president of the Metabolism Foundation and vice president of the Genome Registry. He has also participated in academic and educational service activities, including contributions to biology education initiatives and professional organizations.

Bidlack participated in a 2006 documentary discussing the Repository for Germinal Choice.

Bidlack is a co-author of the textbook Introductory Plant Biology, also published as Stern’s Introductory Plant Biology.
