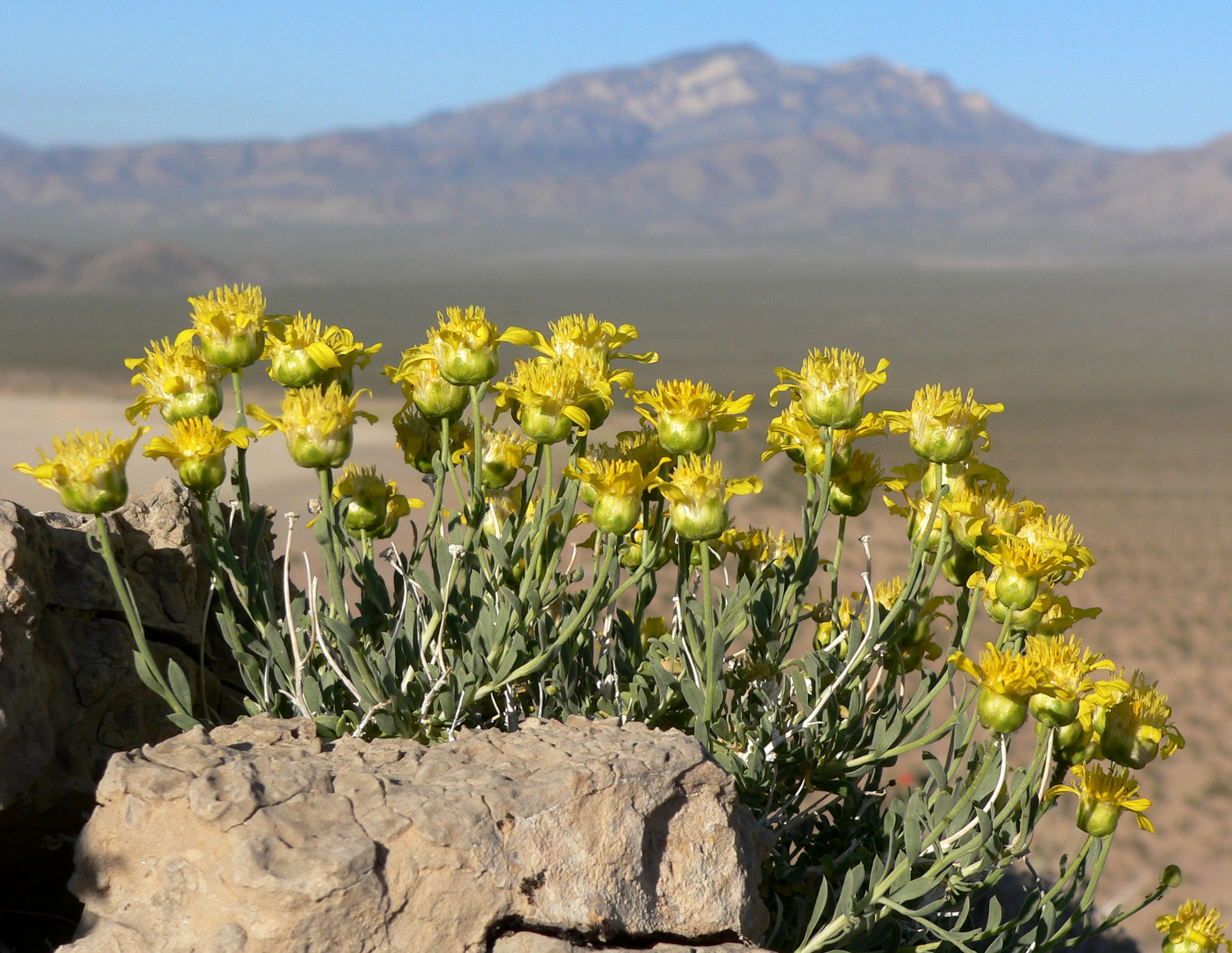
- Acamptopappus shockleyi on the California-Nevada border

Scientific classification
- Kingdom: Plantae
- Clade: Tracheophytes
- Clade: Angiosperms
- Clade: Eudicots
- Clade: Asterids
- Order: Asterales
- Family: Asteraceae
- Subfamily: Asteroideae
- Tribe: Astereae
- Subtribe: Solidagininae
- Genus: Acamptopappus (A.Gray) A.Gray

Synonyms
- Haplopappus section Acamptopappus A.Gray

= Acamptopappus =

Goldenhead

Genus of flowering plants

Acamptopappus is a genus of flowering plants in the family Asteraceae described as a genus in 1873.

Acamptopappus is native to the deserts in southwestern North America. The name is derived from a- (not), campto- (bent), and pappus (down). They are also commonly known as goldenheads.

Acamptopappus plants are eaten by the larvae of some Lepidoptera species including Coleophora acamtopappi which feeds on A. sphaerocephalus.

Species

- A. shockleyi A.Gray – Shockley's Goldenhead - California, Nevada
- A. sphaerocephalus (Harv. & A.Gray) A.Gray – Rayless Goldenhead - California, Nevada, Utah, Arizona

== Bibliography ==
- Gray, Asa (1873). Proceedings of the American Academy of Arts and Sciences. Vol. 8. Boston: Metcalf and Co.
