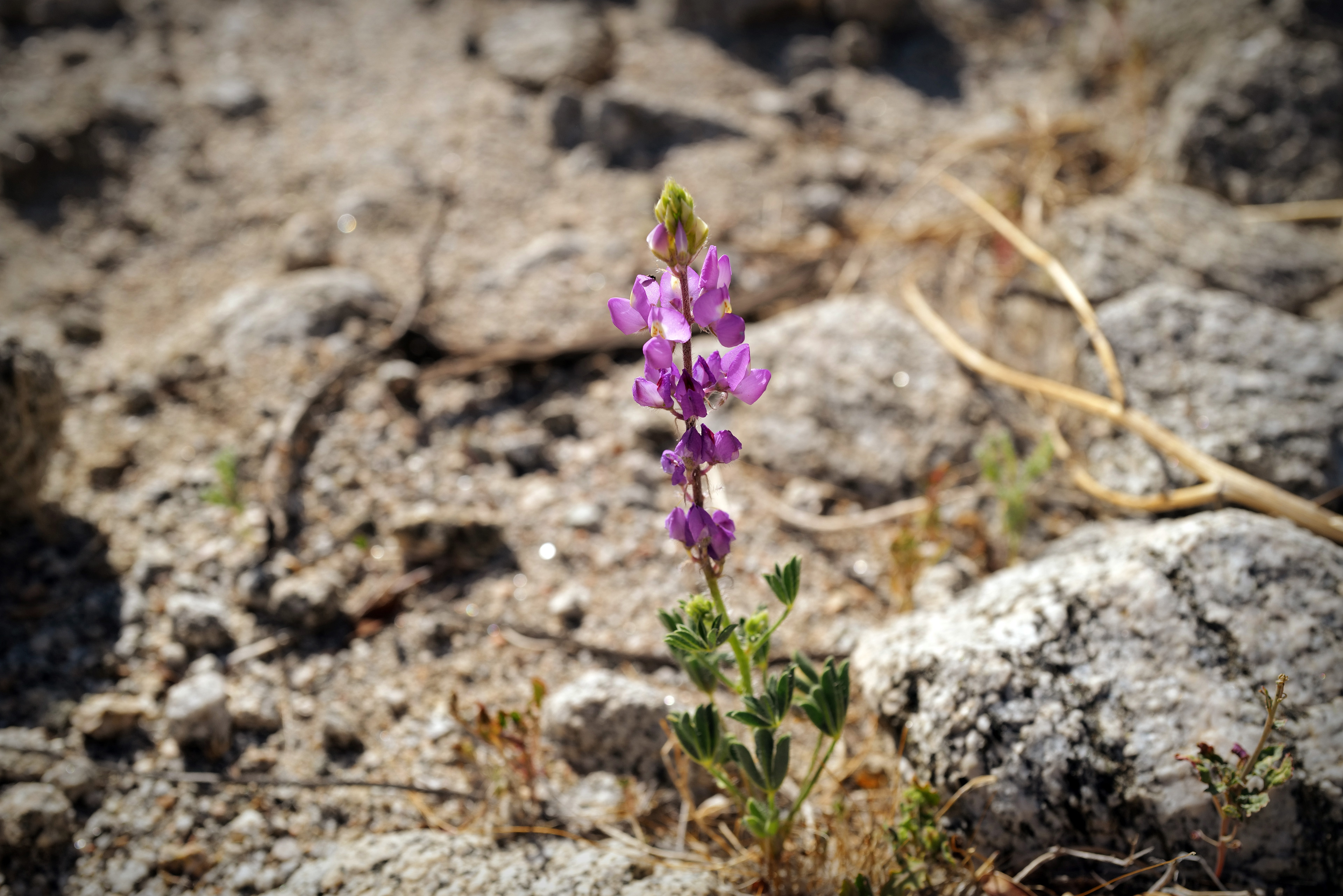

Scientific classification
- Kingdom: Plantae
- Clade: Tracheophytes
- Clade: Angiosperms
- Clade: Eudicots
- Clade: Rosids
- Order: Fabales
- Family: Fabaceae
- Subfamily: Faboideae
- Genus: Lupinus
- Species: L. shockleyi

Binomial name
- Lupinus shockleyi S.Watson

= Lupinus shockleyi =

Species of legume

Lupinus shockleyi, commonly known as the desert lupine and the purple desert lupine, is a species of flowering annual plant in the genus Lupinus (lupines) in the legume family Fabaceae. Native to southern California, southern Nevada, and northwestern Arizona, it can be found in the Mojave Desert. Standing at up to 30 cm (12 in) tall, L. shockleyi blooms from March to May with dark blue-purple petals on flowers which spiral around its inflorescence. It is a two-seeded plant, with seeds that feature a wrinkly texture.

The species was first described by the American botanist Sereno Watson in 1887. Among the specimens that Watson used for his description was one collected by William H. Shockley, a mining engineer who would collect plants while he worked in the region.

== Description ==
Lupinus shockleyi is a species of flowering annual herbaceous plant in the genus Lupinus (lupines) in the legume family Fabaceae. The species is canescent, meaning that it is covered in fine white hairs. It grows to heights between 5 cm (2.0 in) and 30 cm (12 in). The leaves, which are crowded at the plant's base, are cauline (attached to the main stem) by petioles which range between 4 cm (1.6 in) and 12 cm (4.7 in). There are between 8 and 12 leaflets to a petiole, with each measuring between 10 mm (0.39 in) to 30 mm (1.2 in) long and 4 mm (0.16 in) and 10 mm (0.39 in) wide.

The species blooms from March to May in its native range. An inflorescence can range between 2 cm (0.79 in) and 6 cm (2.4 in) long, featuring spiraling flowers. The flowers measure between 4.5 mm (0.18 in) and 6 mm (0.24 in) across. The flower petals are a dark blue-purple color. On legumes, flowers have a typical petal arrangement where a large top petal (the banner) grows outside of the other petals prior to the flower opening and is flanked by two lateral petals (the wings), below which are two more petals (the keel). This flower arrangement developed to facilitate pollination. On L. shockleyi, the banner has yellow coloring and the keel takes a blunt shape.

The species produces fruit that are between 1.5 cm (0.59 in) and 2 cm (0.79 in) long and between 8 mm (0.31 in) and 12 mm (0.47 in) wide. They have an ovate shape and take on a scaly texture when dry. A species is two-seeded, with seeds possessing a wrinkly texture.

== Taxonomy ==
The species was first described by the American botanist Sereno Watson within the Proceedings of the American Academy of Arts and Sciences in 1887. Watson made his description based on plant specimens collected by the Parrish brothers in San Bernardino County, California, during May 1882 and William H. Shockley in Esmeralda County, Nevada, during May 1886. Shockley was a mining engineer who collected specimens on trips he took throughout California and Nevada while he was working in the region.

Common names for L. shockleyi include "desert lupine" and "purple desert lupine".

== Distribution ==
Lupinus shockleyi is found in southern California (where it can be found in the Mojave Desert), southern Nevada, and northwestern Arizona. It primarily inhabits deserts and dry shrublands, favoring open, sandy terrain. It is found at elevations below 2,000 ft (610 m) above sea level. Among the locations L. shockleyi can be found is Anza-Borrego Desert State Park in the Colorado Desert, where they can appear in populations exceeding a thousand individuals.

The Royal Botanic Gardens, Kew's Plants of the World Online predicts the conservation status of L. shockleyi as not threatened with a confidence level of "confident".
