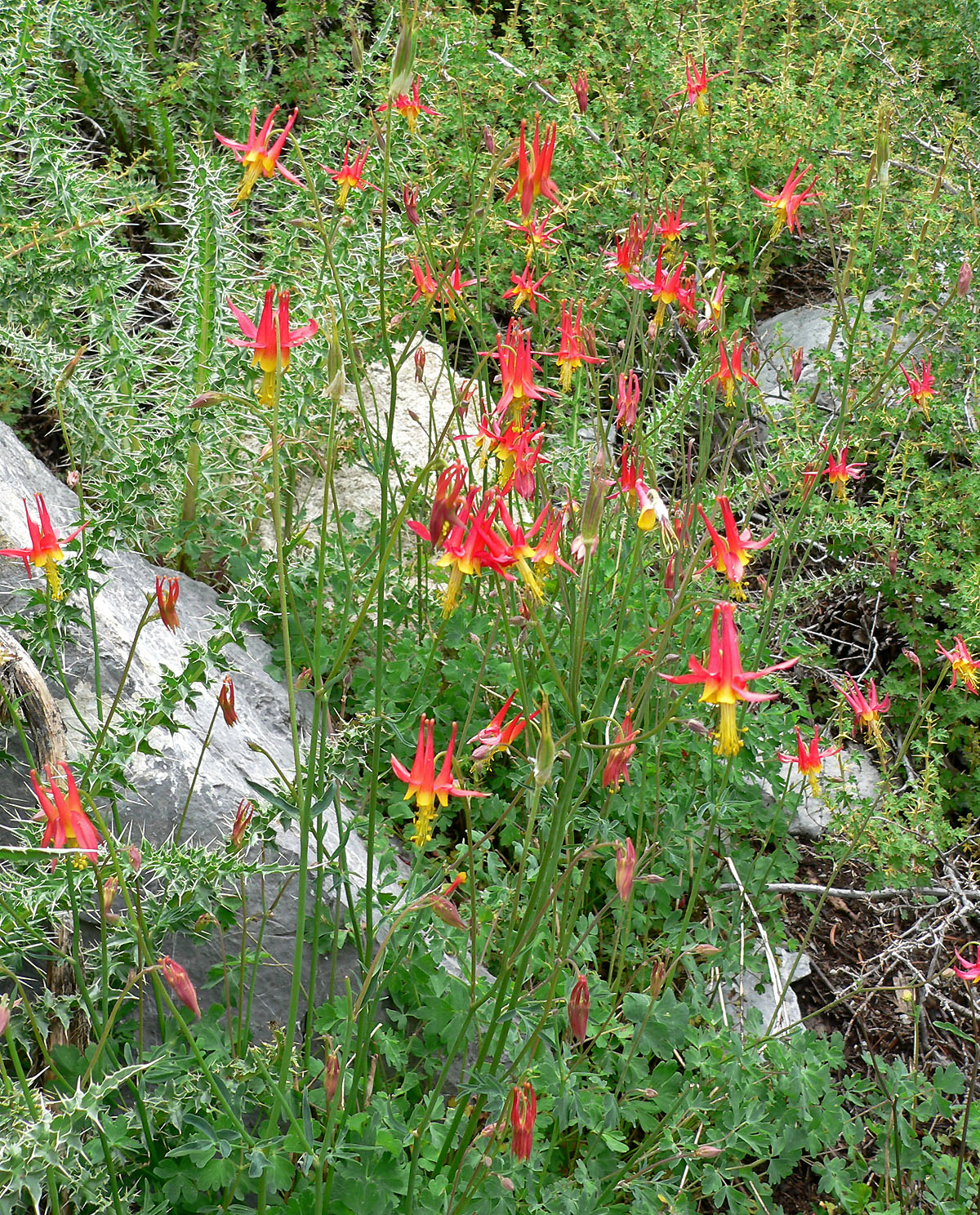

Scientific classification
- Kingdom: Plantae
- Clade: Tracheophytes
- Clade: Angiosperms
- Clade: Eudicots
- Order: Ranunculales
- Family: Ranunculaceae
- Genus: Aquilegia
- Species: A. shockleyi

Binomial name
- Aquilegia shockleyi Eastw.

Synonyms
- List: Aquilegia formosa subsp. caelifax Payson; Aquilegia formosa var. caelifax (Payson) Munz; Aquilegia formosa subsp. dissecta Payson; Aquilegia mohavensis Munz

= Aquilegia shockleyi =

Species of flowering plant

Aquilegia shockleyi, commonly known as Shockley's columbine, the Mojave columbine, and the desert columbine, is a species of perennial flowering plant of the genus Aquilegia (columbine) in the family Ranunculaceae. It is native to southern Nevada and southeastern California in the United States, where it congregates around wet areas.

A. shockleyi produces stems that can grow to 100 cm (39 in) tall. The species blooms in the spring and summer in its natural range, with flowers from April to August. The flowers are red, with yellow and green shades also observed. The flowers possess nectar spurs typically extending 12–25 mm (0.47–0.98 in) long. When consumed raw, the flowers have substantial quantities of nectar and a sweet taste.

The species was first described by the botanist Alice Eastwood in 1905. She named the species for William H. Shockley, a mining engineer who collected the specimen used in the description from Soda Spring Canyon in Esmeralda County, Nevada, in July 1888. While the botanist Edwin Blake Payson appraised the species as only resident within that canyon and described similar plants from Nevada as subspecies of Aquilegia formosa, the botanist Philip A. Munz held A. shockleyi as having a broader range. This range, which considers Payson's subspecies synonymous with A. shockleyi, has been accepted by several taxonomic authorities. The University of Texas at Austin's Lady Bird Johnson Wildflower Center considers A. shockleyi a synonym for A. formosa.

== Description ==
Aquilegia shockleyi is a perennial herbaceous flowering plant of the genus Aquilegia in the family Ranunculaceae. Aquilegia plants produce thin, woody rhizomes. A. shockleyi grow aerial stems that can reach heights of between 40 cm (16 in) and 100 cm (39 in). The basal leaves (leaves growing from the base of the plant) are bi- or triternately compound (leaves with petioles that divide into two or three branches and each bear three leaflets). Visually similar to Aquilegia formosa, A. shockleyi can be distinguished by the grey on the adaxial (upper side) of its leaves.

The species has a spring to summer bloom that lasts from April to August in its native range. It has nodding red flowers. Aquilegia have five sepals on each flower. The sepals on A. shockleyi are arranged perpendicularly to the floral axis. The sepals are typically red but can have shades of yellow and green. Possessing an lanceolate to elliptic shape, each sepal can measure between 10 mm (0.39 in) and 20 mm (0.79 in) long and 4 mm (0.16 in) to 8 mm (0.31 in) wide.

On Aquilegia, there are five petals on each flower, and each petal typically has with a broad portion called a blade on the front of the flower and a tubular portion called a nectar spur that projects backwards. The straight, thick nectar spurs on a A. shockleyi flower are roughly parallel with one another. Colored red or pink, the spurs typically extend between 12 mm (0.47 in) and 25 mm (0.98 in), with some measuring up to 30 mm (1.2 in) long. The spurs tapper from the middle of their lengths until their relatively narrow ends that have swollen tips. The oblong or rounded petal blades are yellow and measure 2 mm (0.079 in) to 5 mm (0.20 in) long and 4 mm (0.16 in) and 7 mm (0.28 in) wide.

The stamens extend beyond the petal blades and measure between 12 mm (0.47 in) and 16 mm (0.63 in) long. The anthers are yellow and measure approximately 1.5 mm (0.059 in) long. Each staminode measures approximately 7 mm (0.28 in) long. The fruit of Aquilegia are follicles. On A. shockleyi, the follicles measure between 14 mm (0.55 in) and 25 mm (0.98 in) long; the follicles have beaks which extend at the openings, measuring between 9 mm (0.35 in) and 12 mm (0.47 in). The species produces seeds that are brown and just shorter than 2 mm (0.079 in) long.

== Taxonomy ==
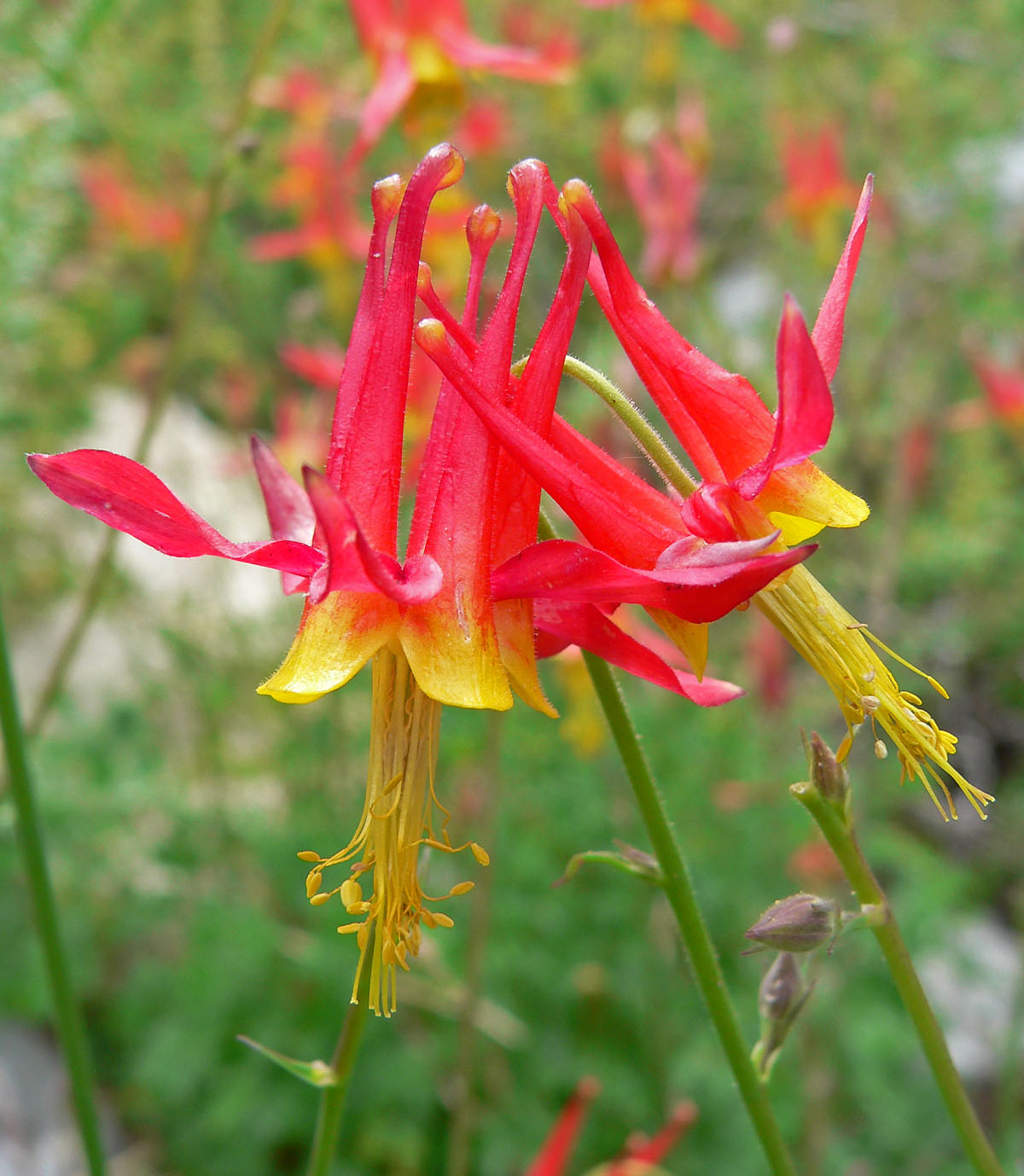
Aquilegia shockleyi flowers in the Spring Mountains, southern Nevada

The species was first described and given its binomial name Aquilegia shockleyi in 1905 by the Canadian-American botanist Alice Eastwood within the Bulletin of the Torrey Botanical Club. Eastwood described the species from William H. Shockley's specimen no. 504, which he had collected at the type locality of Soda Spring Canyon in Esmeralda County, Nevada, in July 1888.

In his 1918 overview of North American Aquilegia, the American botanist Edwin Blake Payson constrained A. shockleyi as only describing plants from the Soda Springs Canyon. He also described two subspecies of Aquilegia formosa to contain similar Nevada plants collected by the American botanist Marcus E. Jones. Payson described A. formosa subsp. dissecta from a single specimen, which had been collected from the Meadow Valley Wash. He described A. formosa subsp. caelifax from specimens collected on Comet Peak.

The American botanist Philip A. Munz described what he held to be a new species named Aquilegia mohavensis in 1938. At the same time, he reevaluated Payson's A. formosa subsp. caelifax, initially renaming as the variety A. formosa var. caelifax. In his 1946 review of Aquilegia, Munz treated both dissecta and caelifax as taxonomic synonyms for A. shockleyi, broadening the species to encompass additional Nevada collections. Munz, treating A. shockleyi as an "entity with a very natural range, and as distinct from A. formosa as are many of the other [Aquilegia] species from each other", also considered his A. mohavensis a synonym for A. shockleyi.

The synonymizations by Munz are accepted by the Royal Botanic Gardens, Kew's Plants of the World Online (POWO), which accepts A. shockleyi as a species. They were also accepted by the Flora of North America, which the United States Forest Service follows in its acceptance of A. shockleyi. The American botanist and gardener Robert Nold likewise accepted A. shockleyi in his 2003 overview of the genus. A. shockleyi is treated as a synonym for A. formosa by the University of Texas at Austin's Lady Bird Johnson Wildflower Center. A. shockleyi was not accepted by the 1993 edition of The Jepson Manual but is presently accepted by its successor, the Jepson eFlora of the University of California, Berkeley's Jepson Herbarium.

=== Etymology ===
The common name columbine for the genus derives from the Latin word columbinus ("dove"), a reference to the flowers' sepals resembling a group of doves. The genus name Aquilegia – already in use before it was formalized by the Swedish biologist Carl Linnaeus in his 1753 Species Plantarum – may come from the Latin word for "eagle", aquila, in reference to the petals' resemblance to eagle talons. A more likely etymology for Aquilegia is a derivation from the Latin aquam legere ("to collect water"), aquilegium (a container of water), or aquilex ("dowser" or "water-finder") in reference to the profusion of nectar in the spurs.

A. shockleyi is named for Shockley, a mining engineer who collected plant specimens in western Nevada and California. Common names for the species are "Shockley's columbine", the "Mojave columbine", and the "desert columbine".

== Distribution and habitat ==
The natural range of Aquilegia shockleyi is found in southern Nevada and southeastern California in the western United States. In California, the species ranges into the Mojave Desert.

The species congregates in wet areas such as springs within its range. It can be found at elevations of 1,200 m (3,900 ft) and 2,700 m (8,900 ft) above sea level. The species inhabits pinyon-juniper woodlands and riparian wetlands. It can be found be found in open areas such as meadows in woodlands and subalpine settings. The POWO predicts the conservation status of A. shockleyi as "not threatened" with a confidence level of "confident".

== Cultivation ==
In 1946, Munz reported that Aquilegia shockleyi was not sold in cultivation. In 2003, Nold reported that the species was in the horticultural trade. Nold said that the species was short-lived, surviving in the garden just long enough to sow seeds.

While plants related to A. shockleyi are known to contain toxins, the non-profit edible plant organization Plants for a Future reports no records of toxicity in the species as of 2025. The organization lists the flowers of A. shockleyi as edible, saying that the flowers – when consumed raw – have significant amounts of nectar and a sweet taste.
