= Electrons and Holes in Semiconductors with Applications to Transistor Electronics =

Book by William Shockley

- Author: William Shockley
- Language: English
- Genre: Non-fiction
- Publisher: D. Van Nostrand
- Publication date: 1950
- ISBN: 0-882-75382-7

Electrons and Holes in Semiconductors with Applications to Transistor Electronics is a book by Nobel Prize winner William Shockley, first published in 1950. It was a primary source, and was used as the first textbook, for scientists and engineers learning the new field of semiconductors as applied to the development of the transistor. This was the invention that led to electronic computers, ubiquitous communication devices, compact electronics controllers, and a host of other important inventions of the last half of the twentieth century.

The book was printed by D. Van Nostrand in New York, and went through many later printings.

An earlier version containing some of the material appeared in the Bell Labs Technical Journal in 1949.

== Contents ==
The arrangement of chapters is as follows:

Part I INTRODUCTION TO TRANSISTOR ELECTRONICS

- Chapter 1: THE BULK PROPERTIES OF SEMICONDUCTORS
- Chapter 2: THE TRANSISTOR AS A CIRCUIT ELEMENT
- Chapter 3: QUANTITATIVE STUDIES OF INJECTION OF HOLES AND ELECTRONS
- Chapter 4: ON THE PHYSICAL THEORY OF TRANSISTORS
- Chapter 5: QUANTUM STATES, ENERGY BANDS, AND BRILLOUIN ZONES

PART II DESCRIPTIVE THEORY OF SEMICONDUCTORS

- Chapter 6: VELOCITIES AND CURRENTS FOR ELECTRONS IN CRYSTALS
- Chapter 7: ELECTRONS AND HOLES IN ELECTRIC AND MAGNETIC FIELDS
- Chapter 8: INTRODUCTORY THEORY OF CONDUCTIVITY AND HALL EFFECT
- Chapter 9: DISTRIBUTIONS OF QUANTUM STATES IN ENERGY
- Chapter 10: FERMI-DIRAC STATISTICS FOR SEMICONDUCTORS
- Chapter 11: MATHEMATICAL THEORY OF CONDUCTIVITY AND HALL EFFECT
- Chapter 12: APPLICATIONS TO TRANSISTOR ELECTRONICS

PART III QUANTUM MECHANICAL FOUNDATIONS

- Chapter 13: INTRODUCTION TO PART III
- Chapter 14: ELEMENTARY QUANTUM MECHANICS WITH CIRCUIT THEORY ANALOGUES
- Chapter 15: THEORY OF ELECTRON AND HOLE VELOCITIES, CURRENTS AND ACCELERATIONS
- Chapter 16: STATISTICAL MECHANICS FOR SEMICONDUCTORS
- Chapter 17: THE THEORY OF TRANSITION PROBABILITIES FOR HOLES AND ELECTRONS
- APPENDIX A Units
- APPENDIX B Periodic Table
- APPENDIX C Values of the physical constants
- APPENDIX D Energy conversion chart
- NAME INDEX
- SUBJECT INDEX
