= May Bradford Shockley =

American surveyor and painter

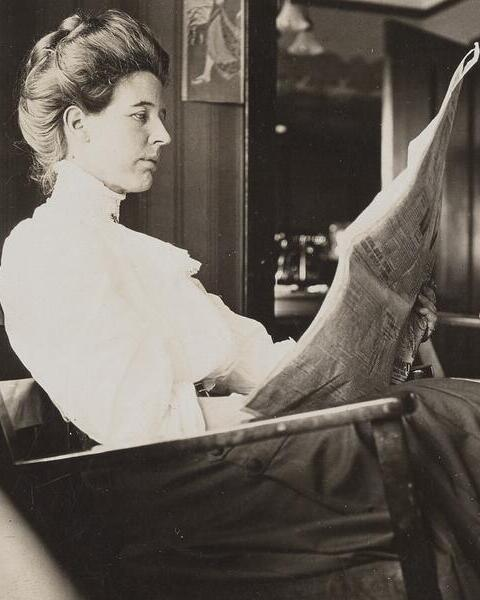
- Shockley, c. 1910
- Born: Cora May Wheeler; May 11, 1879; Moberly, Missouri, US
- Died: March 7, 1977 (aged 97); Palo Alto, California, US
- Other name: May Bradford
- Education: Mathematics and art
- Alma mater: Stanford University (1902)
- Occupations: Mineral surveyor, painter
- Spouse: William Hillman Shockley
- Children: William Shockley

May Bradford Shockley (May 11, 1879 – March 7, 1977) was an American mineral surveyor and painter who became the first woman to hold the post of U.S. Deputy Mineral Surveyor in Nevada. Her artistic inspiration by the Santa Clara Valley ultimately contributed to that region becoming the technological hub known as Silicon Valley.

After studying drawing and mathematics at Stanford University, she joined her father in Tonopah, Nevada, where the two established a mining engineering firm. She received her appointment as a Deputy Mineral Surveyor in 1906, prior to a year of continuing her art education in Paris under the Impressionist painter Richard E. Miller. She returned to Tonopah in 1907, meeting William Hillman Shockley and marrying him the next year.

Her husband was a hobbyist botanist, and she assisted him in collecting plant specimens. They had a son, William Bradford Shockley, while living in London in 1910. The family returned to the United States and settled in Palo Alto, California. While there, May Bradford Shockley's art was acquired by their neighbor and friend Herbert Hoover, who displayed her work at the White House when he was later President of the United States.

Her son would be awarded the Nobel Prize in Physics for co-inventing the transistor. He established Shockley Semiconductor Laboratory in Mountain View, California, to be near his widowed mother. This decision contributed to the region's development into Silicon Valley.

== Early life and education ==
Cora May Wheeler was born in Missouri on May 11, 1879, to a Mr. Wheeler and Sallie Wheeler. After her father abandoned the family, Cora May's mother managed a small boarding house in Sierra County, New Mexico Territory, when she met Seymour Kimball Bradford, a mining surveyor, and the two were engaged in 1884. Bradford and Wheeler married, after which Cora May began going by the name May Bradford. She grew up moving through the mining camps where her father worked in New Mexico, Colorado, and Oregon.

The family moved to the Bradford family farm in Missouri in the late 1880s. May Bradford, a tomboy, was good at rifle shooting and enjoyed horseback riding. During her senior year of high school, Seymour Bradford invited his daughter to join him as he traveled to the Pacific Northwest. After working there, she was granted free tuition at Stanford University in Palo Alto, California, and began attending there in 1898. There, she studied under the artist Bolton Brown. Bradford completed her Bachelor of Arts in 1902, with a degree in drawing and a minor in mathematics.

== Career and family ==
Bradford's professors considered her a talented artist and encouraged her to continue her art training in Paris. Instead, she and her mother traveled to the mining camp at what is now Tonopah, Nevada, to visit Seymour Bradford at his work in the summer of 1902. Upon their return to their home in the San Francisco Bay Area, Sallie Bradford became ill and May Bradford began a teaching position in Menlo Park. A fire in 1904 destroyed Seymour Bradford's mining engineering business, resulting in him calling his daughter to join him in Tonopah to assist in setting up a new firm there. After her arrival, the two established the firm Bradford and Bradford, Surveyors. There, May Bradford drafted maps and checked calculations.

In Tonopah, Bradford had a substantial social life. By 1906, Bradford felt she had the experience necessary to receive an appointment as a mineral surveyor. In 1906, United States Surveyor-General for Nevada Matthew Kyle appointed Bradford, making her the first woman in Nevada to be a U.S. Deputy Mineral Surveyor. After this, Bradford's friend Majorie Bowe convinced Bradford to spend a year continuing her artistic training in Paris; Bowe accompanied Bradford. There, she trained under the Impressionist painter Richard E. Miller.

Bradford returned to Tonopah in June 1907. She successfully sought an appointment as a U.S. Deputy Mineral Surveyor in California, receiving the appointment in August. Soon, Bradford met the mining engineer William Hillman Shockley. Though Shockley was 52 – twenty-two years older than Bradford – Bradford was surprised that, in a Nevadan mining community, she found in Shockley someone who could discuss Italian paintings. The two married on January 20, 1908, in San Francisco. Her husband had traveled Europe and Asia prior to their meeting and was a hobbyist botanist, and she assisted in the collection of his plant specimens.

The couple moved to Palo Alto, California, where they were neighbors and friends with Herbert and Lou Henry Hoover. While he was president of the United States, Herbert Hoover displayed one of Shockley's paintings in the White House.

In London in 1910, the Shockleys had their only child, son William Bradford Shockley. He would later theorize the semiconductor and become one of the co-inventors of the transistor while at Bell Labs, the latter leading to his winning the Nobel Prize in Physics. May Bradford Shockley was artistically inspired by the Santa Clara Valley, and she retired to Palo Alto after a period living in Hollywood following her husband's death. Because of this, her son established Shockley Semiconductor Laboratory in nearby Mountain View, eventually leading to the region developing into "Silicon Valley".
