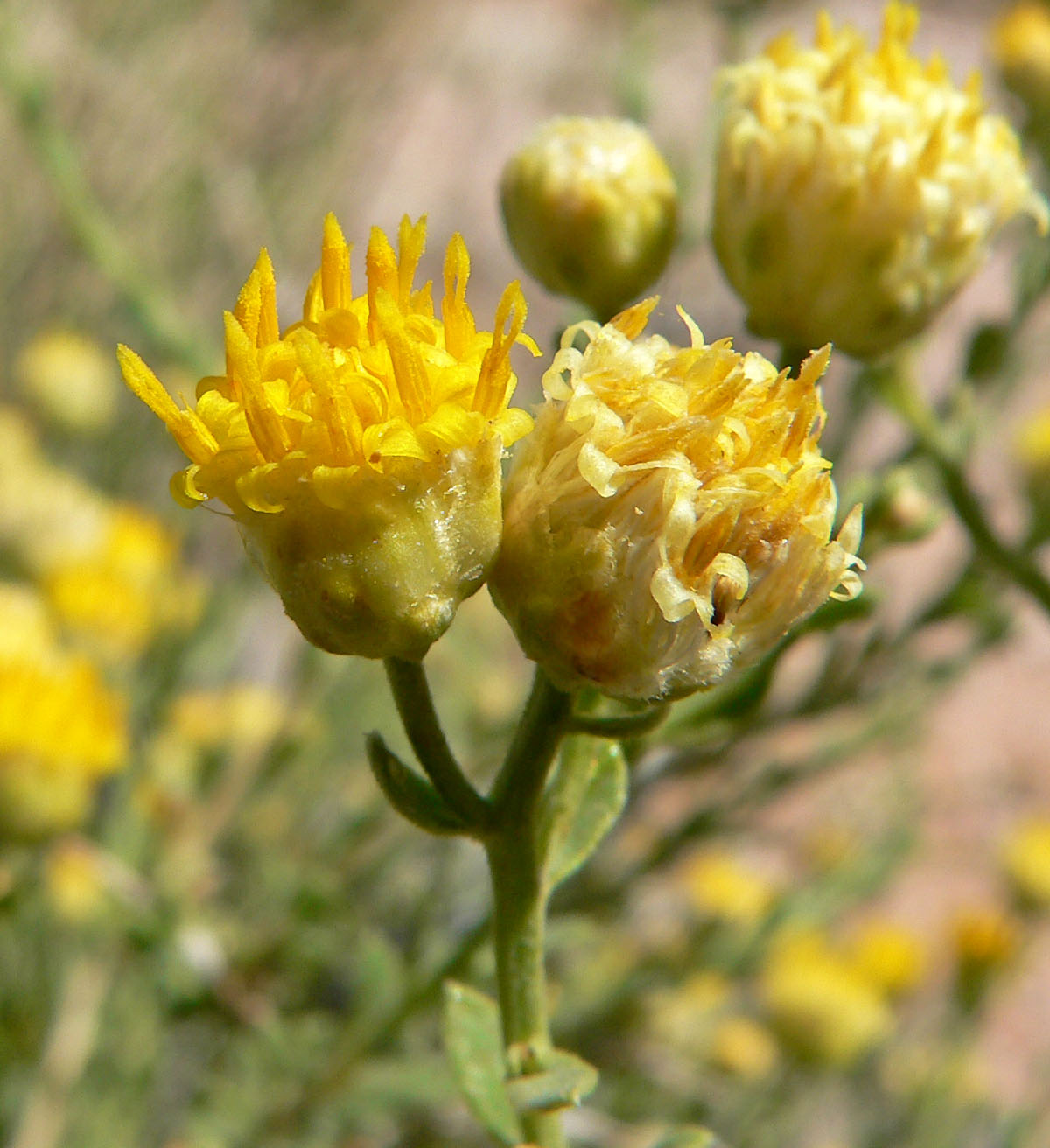

Conservation status
- Secure (NatureServe)

Scientific classification
- Kingdom: Plantae
- Clade: Tracheophytes
- Clade: Angiosperms
- Clade: Eudicots
- Clade: Asterids
- Order: Asterales
- Family: Asteraceae
- Genus: Acamptopappus
- Species: A. sphaerocephalus

Binomial name
- Acamptopappus sphaerocephalus (Harv. & A.Gray ex A.Gray) A.Gray
- Range of Acamptoppaus sphaerocephalus

Synonyms
- Acamptopappus microcephalus M.E.Jones; Haplopappus sphaerocephalus Harv. & A.Gray; Aplopappus sphaerocephalus Harv. & A.Gray

= Acamptopappus sphaerocephalus =

Species of flowering plant

Acamptopappus sphaerocephalus is a species of flowering plant in the family Asteraceae known by the common name rayless goldenhead. It is native to the southwestern United States, where it occurs in southern California, southern Nevada, southern Utah, and Arizona.

This shrub or subshrub produces an upright, branching stem with shreddy whitish or gray bark. It approaches one meter in maximum height but generally grows to 20 to 40 centimeters. The gray-green leaves are linear or lance-shaped and are arranged alternately, sometimes growing in small clusters. They are hairless or have small, rough hairs. The inflorescence is a solitary flower head or a small cluster of heads. The head is hemispherical or spherical in shape. It has yellow disc florets and no ray florets. The fruit is an achene tipped with thick scales and bristles.

This plant grows in the deserts of the southwestern United States, especially the Mojave Desert. It is also present in the southern Great Basin and the northern Sonoran Desert. It grows in desert washes and on plains, mesas, and ridges. It is a member of several plant communities in pinyon-juniper woodlands, mesquite, creosote, and grassy shrubsteppe. It may be associated with catclaw acacia (Acacia greggii), California juniper (Juniperus californica), scrub oak (Quercus turbinella), Joshua tree (Yucca brevifolia), California buckwheat (Eriogonum fasciculatum), golden cholla (Opuntia echinocarpa), and Mojave yucca (Y. schidigera).
