= William H. Shockley =

American engineer, photographer, and botanist (1855–1925)

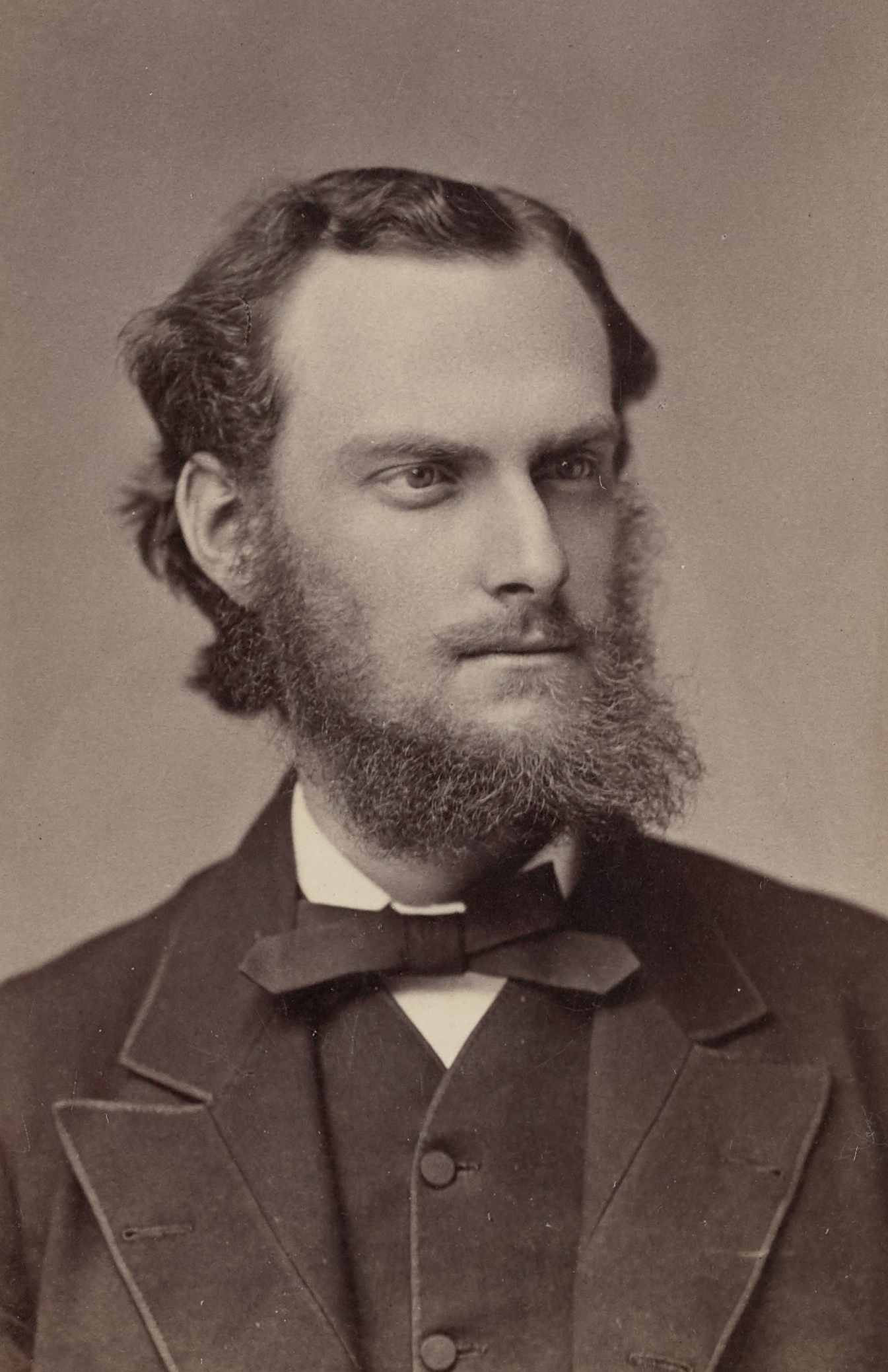
- Shockley as a young man
- Born: William Hillman Shockley; September 18, 1855; New Bedford, Massachusetts, US
- Died: May 26, 1925 (aged 69); Los Angeles, California, US
- Education: Massachusetts Institute of Technology (1875)
- Occupations: Mining engineer, photographer, botanist
- Spouse: May Bradford Shockley
- Children: William Shockley

William Hillman Shockley (September 18, 1855 – May 26, 1925) was an American engineer, photographer, and botanist. After graduating from the Massachusetts Institute of Technology, Shockley worked as a mining engineer in Florida and Nevada, collecting plant specimens during his time in the American West. Fluent in multiple languages, Shockley's engineering work took him to Africa, Asia, Australia, Europe, and South America. Across these regions, he took thousands of photographs documenting both local mining and society.

In 1908, after he moved to Tonopah, Nevada, he married May Bradford, the first woman to be a U.S. Deputy Mineral Surveyor. They had one child, William B. Shockley, who later co-invented the transistor and received a Nobel Prize. After moving to Palo Alto, California, where his family were neighbours and friends of later U.S. president Herbert Hoover, William H. Shockley lectured at Stanford University. He died in 1925.

Shockley's botanical work has resulted in several species being named for him. Over 2,200 photographs of his travels to Asia, Europe, and Oceania, illustrating pre-American influence on mining, have been acquired and partially digitized by Duke University Libraries. Further portions of his archives are held by Stanford University Libraries and the University of Nevada, Las Vegas. His herbarium became part of the collection at the University of California, Berkeley.

== Early life and education ==
William Hillman Shockley was born on September 18, 1855, in New Bedford, Massachusetts to Sarah Shockley and her husband, William. Shockley was descended from Mayflower settler John Alden and what the botanist Willis Linn Jepson called "a sea-faring race, captains of whaling ships and the like"; Shockley's father had been a whaling captain. Shockley had two brothers, both younger, named George and Walter. William H. Shockey graduated with a degree in engineering from the Massachusetts Institute of Technology in 1875.

== Early career ==
After graduation, Shockley worked as a mining engineer with his brothers in Florida, California, and Nevada, becoming well known. Shockley was an amateur botanist, collecting plant specimens. While working at Ocala, Florida, he collected ferns that featured in the botanist Daniel Cady Eaton's The Ferns of North America. He moved to Candelaria, Nevada, in 1880. He lived there until the 1893 Silver Panic collapsed the silver industry. While in Candelaria, he worked as general manager and other positions at the Mount Diablo mine as part of the firm Shockley & Zabriskie.

Fellow mining engineer H. Foster Bain remarked that while Shockley was "pioneering the West and carrying modern science down into the underground workings, [he also] found time to enjoy life and to think of other things than drills and stamp mills." Bain noted Shockley for his amiable personality and knowledge of "art, music, and literature." During this time, Shockley collected specimens in Nevada and California. He was the first person to collect specimens from the California White Mountains, making several trips to the upper elevations of the range. He sent duplicate specimens to the botanist Asa Gray and his herbarium. Gray utilized Shockley's collections to describe the species Acamptopappus shockleyi; additional species were first described from Shockley's collections.

== International work and travels ==
In 1895, Shockley moved to Europe. From 1896 to 1909, he traveled across Asia, Australia, South America, and Africa, seeking mining opportunities. He stayed in Shanghai, China, in 1896 and 1897. In 1897, he was hired by a London-based British–Italian company, the Peking Syndicate Company, as a surveyor for their mining and petroleum operations in the province of Shanxi in western China. Arriving in Beijing in January 1898, he spent the next four months surveying Shanxi. While he and his surveying team had official support from the local government, they were impeded by winter conditions on the mountainous roads they used. During his time in China and on his other travels, Shockley took many photos of both the social life and the mining industry of the places he visited. In 1904, Shockley published a report on his time in Shanxi. His report reflected that the region's coal production had continued a trajectory of depression that the German scientist Ferdinand von Richthofen had observed in 1870, with Shockley estimating an annual output of 50,000 tons from the region against Richthofen's estimate of 160,000 tons three decades before.

Shockley remained in China until 1899, visiting Korea at some point between 1897 and 1899. He also passed through Japan on his way to other locations. From 1899 to 1900, he traveled through and photographed southern Asia, including India, Singapore and its botanic gardens, Ceylon (now Sri Lanka), Penang, and Rangoon. He was in Western Australia from late fall 1901 to May 1902, particularly at the Wiluna Gold Mine. Shockley visited Siberian Russia several times. Some of his photographs from his 1900 visit included Indigenous Siberians. He stayed in Bogoslovsk (now Karpinsk) twice, in the summers and falls of 1904 and 1905, and visited Moscow and Perm.

In 1903, Shockley traveled to Peru. He was in Sudan and Egypt in 1905. In 1909, he traveled to Klyuchi in the Russian Far East, where he worked as a surveyor and assessor for the gold mining operations there. Shockley would also go to Argentina, Chile, and Eritrea as part of his work on mining operations, alongside many European cities. Shockley, being a polyglot, spoke eight languages and was known later in life to study books in Russian and Chinese.

== Return to Nevada ==
In Tonopah, Shockley met May Bradford, who had by then become the first woman to be appointed as a U.S. Deputy Mineral Surveyor. She had been an art and mathematics student at Stanford University and had continued her art training in Paris before moving to Nevada to assist her father at the mine in Tonopah. Bradford, 22 years the junior of the 52-year-old Shockley, wrote that she was "amazed to find someone in the middle of Nevada who could talk to me about Italian paintings". The two wed in San Francisco on January 26, 1908.

== Later life and death ==
In London, the Shockleys had their only son, William Bradford Shockley, in 1910. William B. Shockley co-invented the transistor, for which he was awarded the Nobel Prize in Physics.

They moved to Palo Alto, California, where they were neighbors and friends with Herbert Hoover.

Shockley was a member of the American Institute of Mining Engineers.

Shockley died on May 26, 1925, in Los Angeles.

== Legacy ==
The botanist Sereno Watson described Lupinus shockleyi using a specimen collected by Shockley. The botanist Alice Eastwood named the species Aquilegia shockleyi for Shockley, describing the species from a specimen he collected from Soda Springs Canyon, Nevada.

Image	Species	Described by	Notes	Reference
	Acamptopappus shockleyi (Shockley's goldenhead)	Asa Gray (1882)		
	Aquilegia shockleyi (Shockley's columbine)	Alice Eastwood (1905)	Described from Shockley's specimen no. 504, collected from Soda Springs Canyon, Nevada	
	Eriogonum shockleyi	Sereno Watson (1883)	Described from a specimen Shockley collected in Esmeralda County, Nevada	
	Lupinus shockleyi (Purple desert lupine)	Sereno Watson (1887)		
