= William Shockley =

American physicist (1910–1989)

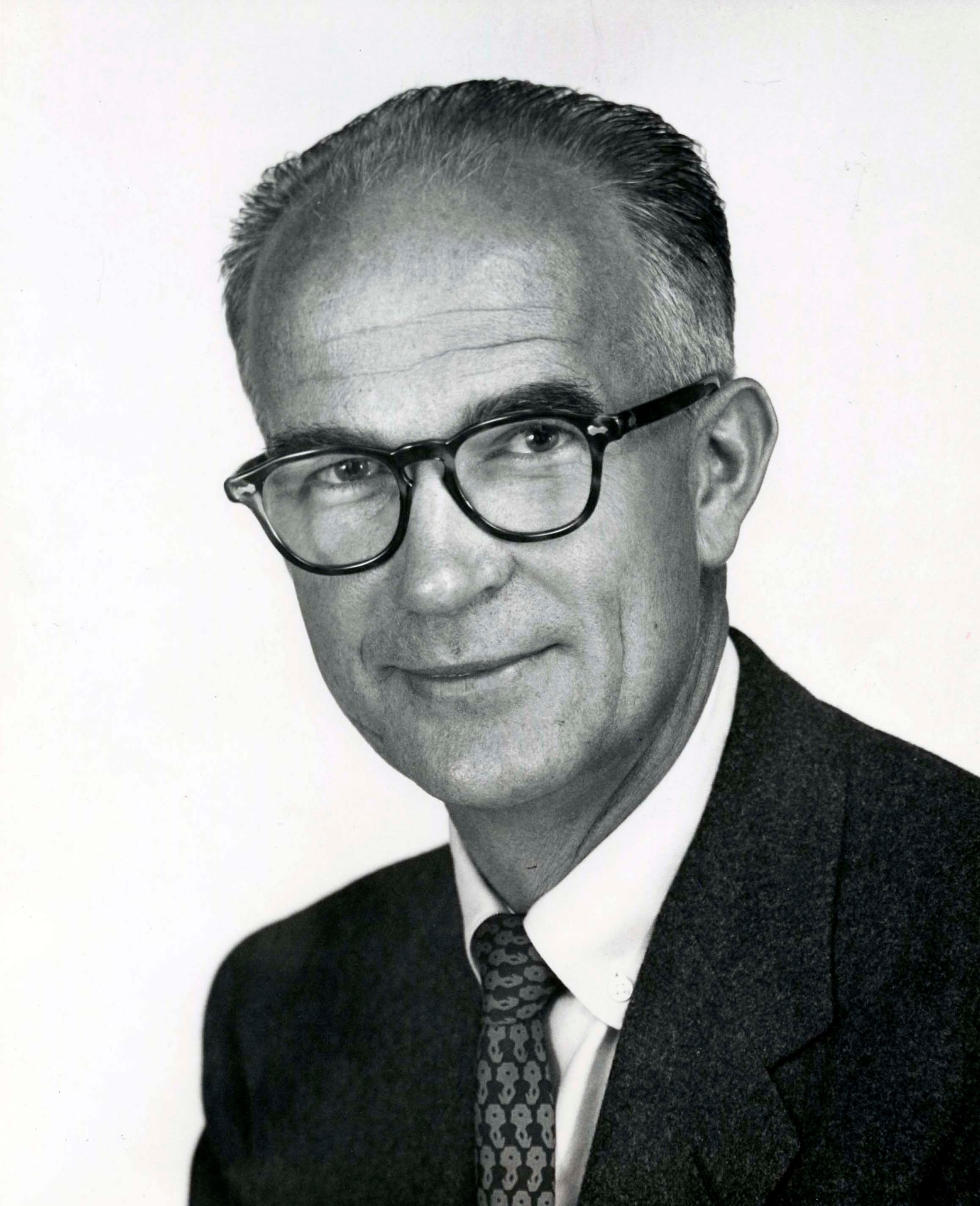
- Shockley in 1956
- Born: William Bradford Shockley; February 13, 1910; London, England
- Died: August 12, 1989 (aged 79); Stanford, California, U.S.
- Resting place: Alta Mesa Memorial Park
- Education: California Institute of Technology: B.S., Physics; Massachusetts Institute of Technology: Ph.D., Physics
- Known for: See list: Point-contact transistor and GJT; Diffused-base transistor; Heterojunction bipolar transistor; Thyristor; BARITT diode; Shockley diode; Junction theory; BJT theory; FET theory; Deathnium; Deep-level trap; Deformation potential theory; Empty lattice approximation; Gradual channel approximation; Lucky electron model; Hot electron theory; Channel length modulation; Process variation; Ion implantation; Low-level injection; Through-silicon via; Transmission line measurement; Shockley diode equation; Shockley–Read–Hall recombination; Shockley partials; Shockley–Ramo theorem; Shockley states; Shockley–James paradox; Shockley–Queisser limit; Haynes–Shockley experiment; Read–Shockley equation; Van Roosbroeck– Shockley equation
- Spouses: Jean Bailey (m. 1933; div. 1955) Emmy Lanning (m. 1955)
- Children: 3
- Parents: William H. Shockley (father); May Bradford Shockley (mother)
- Awards: Morris Liebmann Memorial Prize (1952); Comstock Prize in Physics (1953); Oliver E. Buckley Prize (1953); Nobel Prize in Physics (1956); Wilhelm Exner Medal (1963); Holley Medal (1963); IEEE Medal of Honor (1980)
- Scientific career
- Fields: Physics
- Workplaces: Bell Labs; Shockley Semiconductor Laboratory; Stanford University
- Thesis: Electronic bands in sodium chloride (1936)
- Doctoral advisor: John C. Slater

William Bradford Shockley (February 13, 1910 – August 12, 1989) was an American physicist and white supremacist. He was the manager of a research group at Bell Labs that included John Bardeen and Walter Brattain. The three scientists were jointly awarded the 1956 Nobel Prize in Physics "for their researches on semiconductors and their discovery of the transistor effect."

Partly as a result of Shockley's attempts to commercialize a new transistor design in the 1950s and 1960s, California's Silicon Valley became a hotbed of electronics innovation. He recruited brilliant employees, but quickly alienated them with his autocratic and erratic management; they left and founded major companies in the industry.

In his later life, while he was a professor of electrical engineering at Stanford University and afterward, Shockley became known for his outspoken promotion of racism and eugenics.

== Early life and education ==
William Bradford Shockley was born on February 13, 1910, in London to American parents, and was raised in the family's hometown of Palo Alto, California, from the age of three. His father, William Hillman Shockley, was a mining engineer who speculated in mines for a living and spoke eight languages. His mother, May Bradford Shockley, grew up in the American West, graduated from Stanford University, and became the first female U.S. deputy mining surveyor.

Shockley was homeschooled up to the age of eight, due to his parents' dislike of public schools as well as Shockley's habit of violent tantrums. Shockley learned some physics at a young age from a neighbor who was a Stanford physics professor. Shockley spent two years at Palo Alto Military Academy, then briefly enrolled in the Los Angeles Coaching School to study physics and later graduated from Hollywood High School in 1927.

After high school, Shockley spent one year studying at the University of California, Los Angeles, before transferring to the California Institute of Technology, where he graduated in 1932 with a Bachelor of Science in Physics. He then entered the Massachusetts Institute of Technology on a teaching fellowship, and received a Doctor of Philosophy in 1936 for a thesis on the electronic band structure of sodium chloride, supervised by John C. Slater.

== Career and research ==
Shockley was one of the first recruits to Bell Telephone Laboratories by Mervin Kelly, who became director of research at the company in 1936 and focused on hiring solid-state physicists. Shockley joined a group headed by Clinton Davisson in Murray Hill, New Jersey. Executives at Bell Labs had theorized that semiconductors may offer solid-state alternatives to the vacuum tubes used throughout Bell's nationwide telephone system. Shockley conceived a number of designs based on copper-oxide semiconductor materials, and collaborated with Walter Brattain's unsuccessful attempt to create a prototype in 1939.

Shockley published a number of fundamental papers on solid-state physics in Physical Review. In 1938, he received his first patent, "Electron Discharge Device", on electron multipliers.

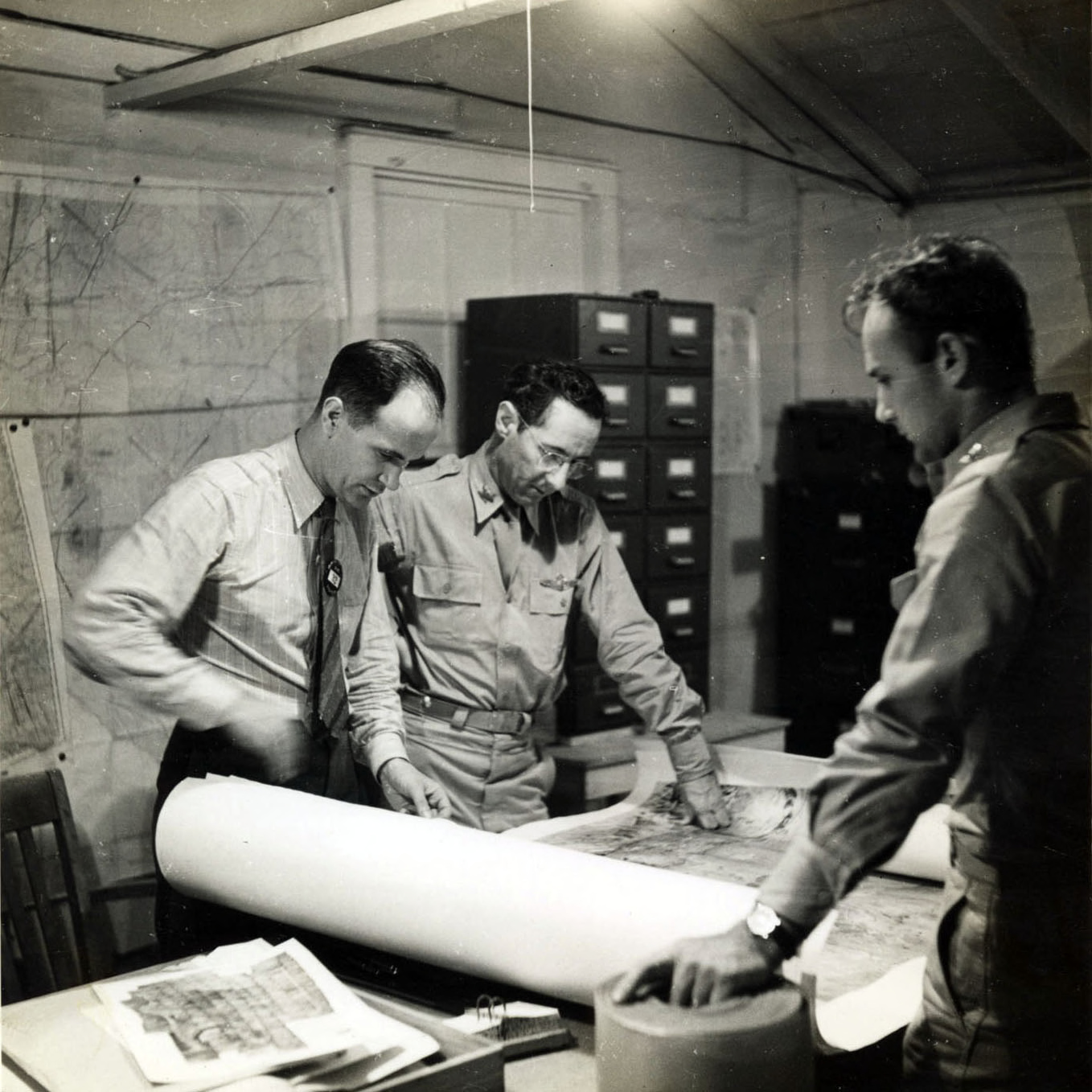
Shockley (left) during his years in military research

During World War II, Shockley's prior research was interrupted and he became involved in radar research in Manhattan (New York City). Also at Bell, early in 1942 Shockley pioneered applied work on Delay-line memory, which was 1/100th the cost of competing electronic memory of vacuum tube technology and approximately as rapid. This technology was incorporated inside the ENIAC computer by 1945.

In May 1942, he took leave from Bell Labs to become a research director at Columbia University's Anti-Submarine Warfare Operations Group. This involved devising methods for countering the tactics of submarines with improved convoying techniques, optimizing depth charge patterns, and so on. Shockley traveled frequently to the Pentagon and Washington to meet high-ranking officers and government officials.

In 1944, he organized a training program for B-29 bomber pilots to use new radar bomb sights. In late 1944, he took a three-month tour to bases around the world to assess the results. For this project, Secretary of War Robert Patterson awarded Shockley the Medal for Merit on October 17, 1946. In July 1945, the War Department asked Shockley to prepare a report on the question of probable casualties from an invasion of the Japanese mainland. Shockley concluded:

If the study shows that the behavior of nations in all historical cases comparable to Japan's has in fact been invariably consistent with the behavior of the troops in battle, then it means that the Japanese dead and ineffectives at the time of the defeat will exceed the corresponding number for the Germans. In other words, we shall probably have to kill at least 5 to 10 million Japanese. This might cost us between 1.7 and 4 million casualties including 400,000 to 800,000 killed.

This report influenced the decision of the United States to drop atomic bombs on Hiroshima and Nagasaki, which preceded the surrender of Japan.

Shockley was the first physicist to propose a log-normal distribution to model the creation process for scientific research papers.

=== Invention of the transistor ===
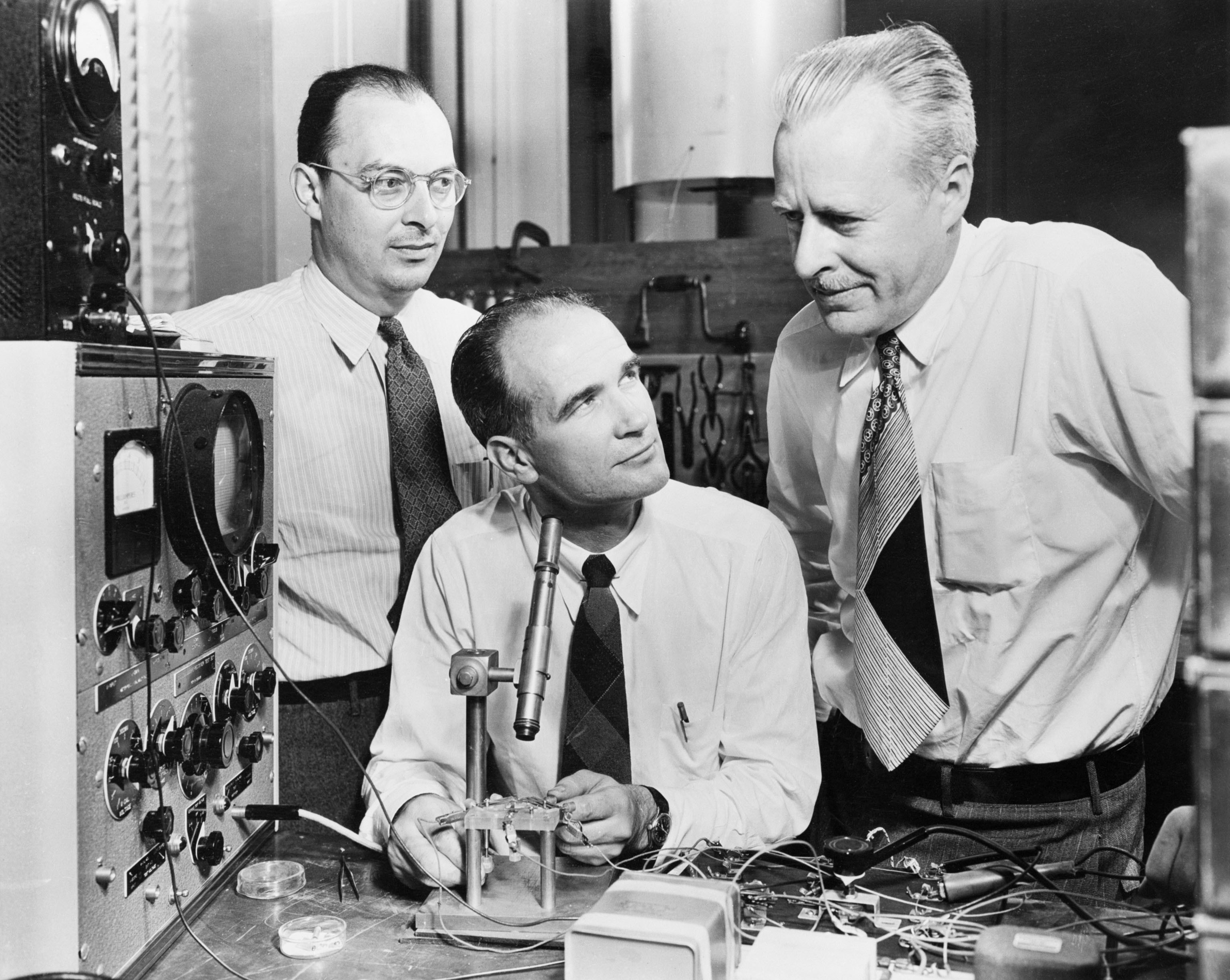
Left to right: John Bardeen, Shockley, and Walter Brattain at Bell Labs, 1948

Shortly after the war ended in 1945, Bell Labs formed a solid-state physics group, led by Shockley and chemist Stanley Morgan, which included John Bardeen, Walter Brattain, physicist Gerald Pearson, chemist Robert Gibney, electronics expert Hilbert Moore, and several technicians. Their assignment was to seek a solid-state alternative to fragile glass vacuum tube amplifiers. First attempts were based on Shockley's ideas about using an external electrical field on a semiconductor to affect its conductivity. These experiments failed every time in all sorts of configurations and materials. The group was at a standstill until Bardeen suggested a theory that invoked surface states that prevented the field from penetrating the semiconductor. The group changed its focus to study these surface states and they met almost daily to discuss the work. The group had excellent rapport and freely exchanged ideas.

By the winter of 1946, they had enough results that Bardeen submitted a paper on the surface states to Physical Review. Brattain started experiments to study the surface states through observations made while shining a bright light on the semiconductor's surface. This led to several more papers (one of them co-authored with Shockley), which estimated the density of the surface states to be more than enough to account for their failed experiments. The pace of the work picked up significantly when they started to surround point contacts between the semiconductor and the conducting wires with electrolytes. Moore built a circuit that allowed them to vary the frequency of the input signal easily. Finally they began to get some evidence of power amplification when Pearson, acting on a suggestion by Shockley, put a voltage on a droplet of glycol borate placed across a p–n junction.

Bell Labs' attorneys soon discovered Shockley's field effect principle had been anticipated and devices based on it patented in 1930 by Julius Lilienfeld, who filed his MESFET-like patent in Canada on October 22, 1925. Although the patent appeared "breakable" (it could not work) the patent attorneys based one of its four patent applications only on the Bardeen-Brattain point contact design. Three others (submitted first) covered the electrolyte-based transistors with Bardeen, Gibney and Brattain as the inventors.

Shockley's name was not on any of these patent applications. This angered Shockley, who thought his name should also be on the patents because the work was based on his field effect idea. He even made efforts to have the patent written only in his name, and told Bardeen and Brattain of his intentions.

Shockley, angered by not being included on the patent applications, secretly continued his own work to build a different sort of transistor based on junctions instead of point contacts; he expected this kind of design would be more likely to be commercially viable. The point contact transistor, he believed, would prove to be fragile and difficult to manufacture. Shockley was also dissatisfied with certain parts of the explanation for how the point contact transistor worked and conceived of the possibility of minority carrier injection.

On February 13, 1948, another team member, John N. Shive, built a point contact transistor with bronze contacts on the front and back of a thin wedge of germanium, proving that holes could diffuse through bulk germanium and not just along the surface as previously thought. Shive's invention sparked Shockley's invention of the junction transistor. A few months later he invented an entirely new, considerably more robust, type of transistor with a layer or 'sandwich' structure. This structure went on to be used for the vast majority of all transistors into the 1960s, and evolved into the bipolar junction transistor. Shockley later described the workings of the team as a "mixture of cooperation and competition". He also said that he kept some of his own work secret until his "hand was forced" by Shive's 1948 advance. Shockley worked out a rather complete description of what he called the "sandwich" transistor, and a first proof of principle was obtained on April 7, 1949.

Meanwhile, Shockley worked on his book, Electrons and Holes in Semiconductors, which was published as a 558-page treatise in 1950. The tome included Shockley's critical ideas of drift and diffusion and the differential equations that govern the flow of electrons in solid state crystals. Shockley's diode equation is also described. This seminal work became the reference text for other scientists working to develop and improve new variants of the transistor and other devices based on semiconductors.

This resulted in his invention of the bipolar junction transistor, which was announced at a press conference on July 4, 1951.

The ensuing publicity generated by the "invention of the transistor" often thrust Shockley to the fore, much to the chagrin of Bardeen and Brattain. Bell Labs management, however, consistently presented all three inventors as a team. Though Shockley would correct the record where reporters gave him sole credit for the invention, he eventually infuriated and alienated Bardeen and Brattain, and he essentially blocked the two from working on the junction transistor. Bardeen began pursuing a theory for superconductivity and left Bell Labs in 1951. Brattain refused to work with Shockley further and was assigned to another group. Neither Bardeen nor Brattain had much to do with the development of the transistor beyond the first year after its invention.

=== Shockley Semiconductor ===
In June 1955, Shockley left Bell Labs to start the Shockley Semiconductor Laboratory in Mountain View, California, which was close to his elderly mother living in Palo Alto, California. In September 1955, Shockley secured two years of funding for the company from Beckman Instruments. Shockley Semiconductor was the first establishment working on silicon semiconductor devices in what came to be known as Silicon Valley.

Shockley recruited brilliant employees to his company, but alienated them by undermining them relentlessly. "He may have been the worst manager in the history of electronics", according to his biographer Joel Shurkin. Shockley was autocratic, domineering, erratic, hard-to-please, and increasingly paranoid. In one well-known incident, he demanded lie detector tests to find the "culprit" after a company secretary suffered a minor cut. In late 1957, eight of Shockley's best researchers, who would come to be known as the "traitorous eight", resigned after Shockley decided not to continue research into silicon-based semiconductors; they went on to form Fairchild Semiconductor. Shockley Semiconductor never recovered from this loss. The company was purchased by Clevite in 1960, sold again to ITT in 1968, and shortly after, officially closed.

Over the course of the next 20 years, more than 65 new enterprises would end up having employee connections back to Fairchild.

A group of about thirty colleagues have met on and off since 1956 to reminisce about their time with Shockley, "the man who brought silicon to Silicon Valley", as the group's organizer said in 2002.

In 1963, Shockley left Shockley Semiconductor to become Alexander M. Poniatoff Professor of Engineering Science at Stanford University, where he remained until his retirement in 1974. He was also an executive consultant at Bell Labs from 1963 to 1975.

== Racist and eugenicist views ==
In the last two decades of his life, Shockley, who had no degree in genetics, became widely known for his extreme views on race and human intelligence, and his advocacy of eugenics. As described by his Los Angeles Times obituary, "He went from being a physicist with impeccable academic credentials to amateur geneticist, becoming a lightning rod whose views sparked campus demonstrations and a cascade of calumny." He thought his work was important to the future of humanity and he also described it as the most important aspect of his career. He argued that a higher rate of reproduction among purportedly less intelligent people was having a dysgenic effect, and argued that a drop in average intelligence would lead to a decline in civilization. He also claimed that black people were genetically and intellectually inferior to white people.

Shockley's biographer Joel Shurkin notes that for much of Shockley's life in the racially segregated United States of the time, he had almost no contact with black people. Bo Lojek, a biographer and former colleague of Shockley, suggests that a 1963 local crime news story and shortly later a forwarded J. P. Guilford article influenced Shockley's thinking.

Shockley was one of the race theorists who received money from the Pioneer Fund, and at least one donation to him came from its founder, the eugenicist Wickliffe Draper. Shockley proposed that individuals with IQs below 100 should be paid to undergo voluntary sterilization, $1,000 for each of their IQ points under 100. This proposal led to the University of Leeds to withdraw its offer of an honorary degree to him. Anthropologist and far-right activist Roger Pearson defended Shockley in a self-published book co-authored with Shockley.

In 1973, University of Wisconsin–Milwaukee professor Edgar G. Epps argued that "William Shockley's position lends itself to racist interpretations". On Firing Line with William F. Buckley Jr. in 1974, Shockley argued, "My research leads me inescapably to the opinion that the major cause of the American Negro's intellectual and social deficits is hereditary and racially genetic in origin and, thus, not remediable to a major degree by practical improvements in the environment."

The Southern Poverty Law Center describes Shockley as a white nationalist who failed to produce evidence for his eugenic theories amidst "near-universal acknowledgement that his work was that of a racist crank". The science writer Angela Saini describes Shockley as having been "a notorious racist."

Shockley insisted that he was not a racist. He wrote that his findings do not support white supremacy, instead claiming that East Asians and Jews fare better than whites intellectually. In 1973, Edgar Epps wrote that "I am pleased that Professor Shockley is not an Aryan supremacist, but I would remind him that a theory espousing hereditary superiority of Orientals or Jews is just as racist in nature as the Aryan supremacy doctrine".

Shockley's advocacy of eugenics triggered protests. In one incident, the science society Sigma Xi, fearing violence, canceled a 1968 convocation in Brooklyn where Shockley was scheduled to speak.

In Atlanta in 1981, Shockley filed a libel suit against the Atlanta Constitution after a science writer, Roger Witherspoon, compared Shockley's advocacy of a voluntary sterilization program to Nazi human experimentation. The suit took three years to go to trial. Shockley won the suit but he only received one dollar in damages and he did not receive any punitive damages. Shockley's biographer Joel Shurkin, a science writer on the staff of Stanford University during those years, sums this statement up by saying that it was defamatory, but Shockley's reputation was not worth much by the time the trial reached a verdict. Shockley taped his telephone conversations with reporters, transcribed them, and sent the transcripts to the reporters by registered mail. At one point, he toyed with the idea of making the reporters take a simple quiz on his work before he would discuss the subject matter of it with them. His habit of saving all of his papers (including laundry lists) provides abundant documentation on his life for researchers.

Shockley was a candidate for the Republican nomination in the 1982 United States Senate election in California. He ran on a single-issue platform of opposing the "dysgenic threat" that he alleged African-Americans and other groups posed. He came in eighth place in the primary, receiving 0.37% of the vote. According to Shurkin, by this time, "His racism destroyed his credibility. Almost no one wanted to be associated with him, and many of those who were willing did him more harm than good".

=== Foundation for Research and Education on Eugenics and Dysgenics ===
The Foundation for Research and Education on Eugenics and Dysgenics (FREED) was a non-profit organization founded in March 1970 in the United States formed to support the research of Shockley, who was the president of the foundation and R. Travis Osborne, a member. The foundation released the newsletter "FREED" and research papers at Stanford University.

The organization was founded according to its mission "solely for scientific and educational purposes related to human population and quality problems".

From 1969 to 1976, the Pioneer Fund allocated about $2.5 million (adjusted-for-inflation in 2023) to support Shockley's endeavors. This funding was distributed through grants to Stanford University for the exploration of "research into the factors which affect genetic potential" and also directly to FREED.

Via FREED, Shockley promoted his concept of a "Voluntary Sterilization Bonus Plan", proposing to compensate economically disadvantaged women for undergoing sterilization procedures.

In 1970, Shockley listed former senator of Alaska Ernest Gruening as a director of FREED.

== Personal life ==
At age 23 and while still a student, Shockley married Jean Bailey in August 1933. The couple had two sons and a daughter. Shockley and Bailey divorced in 1955. That year, he married Emily Lanning, a psychiatric nurse; she helped him with some of his theories. Although one of his sons earned a PhD at Stanford University and his daughter graduated from Radcliffe College, Shockley believed his children "represent a very significant regression ... my first wife – their mother – had not as high an academic-achievement standing as I had".

Shockley was an accomplished rock climber, going often to the Shawangunks in the Hudson River Valley. His 1953 route known as "Shockley's Ceiling", is one of the classic climbing routes in the area. Mountain Project, a web-based climbing guidebook, reports that the route's name has been changed to "The Ceiling" due to Shockley's eugenics controversies. A 1996 guidebook notes that the original party on this route avoided the ceiling in question. The guidebook lists this variation as "Shockley's Without." He was popular as a speaker, lecturer, and amateur magician. He once "magically" produced a bouquet of roses at the end of his address before the American Physical Society.

Shockley was also known in his early years for elaborate practical jokes. He had a longtime hobby of raising ant colonies.

Shockley donated sperm to the Repository for Germinal Choice, a sperm bank founded by Robert Klark Graham in hopes of spreading humanity's best genes. The bank, called by the media the "Nobel Prize sperm bank", claimed to have three Nobel Prize-winning donors, though Shockley was the only one to publicly acknowledge his involvement. However, Shockley's controversial views brought the Repository for Germinal Choice a degree of notoriety and may have discouraged other Nobel Prize winners from donating sperm.

Shockley was unhappy in his life and was often psychologically and sometimes physically abusive toward his sons. On one occasion, he reportedly played Russian roulette on himself as part of a suicide attempt.

Funeral urn

Shockley died of prostate cancer on August 12, 1989, in Stanford, California, at the age of 79. At the time of his death he was estranged from most of his friends and family, with the exception of his second wife. His children learned of his death by reading his obituary in the newspaper. He is buried in Alta Mesa Memorial Park in Palo Alto, California.

== Recognition ==
=== Memberships ===
Year	Organization	Type	Ref.
1951	National Academy of Sciences	Member	

=== Awards ===
Year	Organization	Award	Co-recipients	Citation	Ref.
1952	Institute of Radio Engineers	Morris Liebmann Memorial Prize	—	"In recognition of his contributions to the creation and development of the transistor."	
1953	National Academy of Sciences	Comstock Prize in Physics	—	"For his pioneering investigations and exposition of electric and magnetic properties of solid materials; in particular for his researches in the conduction of electricity by electrons and holes in semiconductors."	
1953	American Physical Society	Oliver E. Buckley Prize	—	"For contributions to the physics of semiconductors."	
1956	Royal Swedish Academy of Sciences	Nobel Prize in Physics	John Bardeen and Walter Brattain	"For their researches on semiconductors and their discovery of the transistor effect."	
1963	Österreichischer Gewerbeverein	Wilhelm Exner Medal	—	—	
1963	American Society of Mechanical Engineers	Holley Medal	—	—	
1980	Institute of Electrical and Electronics Engineers	IEEE Medal of Honor	—	"For the invention of the junction transistor, the analog and the junction field-effect transistor, and the theory underlying their operation."	

== Patents ==
Shockley was granted over 90 US patents. Some notable ones are:

- US 2502488 Semiconductor Amplifier. April 4, 1950; his first granted patent involving transistors.
- US 2569347 Circuit element utilizing semiconductive material. September 25, 1951; His earliest applied for (June 26, 1948) patent involving transistors.
- US 2655609 Bistable Circuits. October 13, 1953; Used in computers.
- US 2787564 Forming Semiconductive Devices by Ionic Bombardment. April 2, 1957; The diffusion process for implantation of impurities.
- US 3031275 Process for Growing Single Crystals. April 24, 1962; Improvements on process for production of basic materials.
- US 3053635 Method of Growing Silicon Carbide Crystals. September 11, 1962; Exploring other semiconductors.

== Publications ==
=== Pre-war articles ===
- Johnson, R. P.; Shockley, W. (March 15, 1936). "An Electron Microscope for Filaments: Emission and Adsorption by Tungsten Single Crystals". Physical Review. 49 (6). American Physical Society (APS): 436–440. Bibcode:1936PhRv...49..436J. doi:10.1103/physrev.49.436. ISSN 0031-899X.
- Slater, J. C.; Shockley, W. (October 15, 1936). "Optical Absorption by the Alkali Halides". Physical Review. 50 (8). American Physical Society (APS): 705–719. Bibcode:1936PhRv...50..705S. doi:10.1103/physrev.50.705. ISSN 0031-899X.
- Shockley, William (October 15, 1936). "Electronic Energy Bands in Sodium Chloride". Physical Review. 50 (8). American Physical Society (APS): 754–759. Bibcode:1936PhRv...50..754S. doi:10.1103/physrev.50.754. ISSN 0031-899X.
- Shockley, W. (October 15, 1937). "The Empty Lattice Test of the Cellular Method in Solids". Physical Review. 52 (8). American Physical Society (APS): 866–872. Bibcode:1937PhRv...52..866S. doi:10.1103/physrev.52.866. ISSN 0031-899X.
- Shockley, William (August 15, 1939). "On the Surface States Associated with a Periodic Potential". Physical Review. 56 (4). American Physical Society (APS): 317–323. Bibcode:1939PhRv...56..317S. doi:10.1103/physrev.56.317. ISSN 0031-899X.
- Steigman, J.; Shockley, W.; Nix, F. C. (July 1, 1939). "The Self-Diffusion of Copper". Physical Review. 56 (1). American Physical Society (APS): 13–21. Bibcode:1939PhRv...56...13S. doi:10.1103/physrev.56.13. ISSN 0031-899X.

=== Post-war articles ===
- Shockley, W. (1949). "The Theory of p-n Junctions in Semiconductors and p-n Junction Transistors". Bell System Technical Journal. 28 (3). Institute of Electrical and Electronics Engineers (IEEE): 435–489. Bibcode:1949BSTJ...28..435S. doi:10.1002/j.1538-7305.1949.tb03645.x. ISSN 0005-8580.
- Shockley, W.; Pearson, G. L.; Haynes, J. R. (1949). "Hole Injection in Germanium-Quantitative Studies and Filamentary Transistors". Bell System Technical Journal. 28 (3). Institute of Electrical and Electronics Engineers (IEEE): 344–366. Bibcode:1949BSTJ...28..344S. doi:10.1002/j.1538-7305.1949.tb03641.x. ISSN 0005-8580.
- Shockley, W. (1951). "Hot Electrons in Germanium and Ohm's Law". Bell System Technical Journal. 30 (4). Institute of Electrical and Electronics Engineers (IEEE): 990–1034. doi:10.1002/j.1538-7305.1951.tb03692.x. ISSN 0005-8580.
- Shockley, W. (1954). "Negative Resistance Arising from Transit Time in Semiconductor Diodes". Bell System Technical Journal. 33 (4). Institute of Electrical and Electronics Engineers (IEEE): 799–826. Bibcode:1954BSTJ...33..799S. doi:10.1002/j.1538-7305.1954.tb03742.x. ISSN 0005-8580.
- Sze, S. M.; Shockley, W. (May 6, 1967). "Unit-Cube Expression for Space-Charge Resistance". Bell System Technical Journal. 46 (5). Institute of Electrical and Electronics Engineers (IEEE): 837–842. Bibcode:1967BSTJ...46..837S. doi:10.1002/j.1538-7305.1967.tb01716.x. ISSN 0005-8580.
- "On the Statistics of Individual Variations of Productivity in Research Laboratories", Shockley 1957
- On heredity, dysgenics and social issues:
  - Shockley 1965, "Is Quality of US Population Declining." U.S. News & World Report, November 22, pp. 68–71
  - Shockley 1966, "Possible Transfer of Metallurgical and Astronomical Approaches to Problem of Environment versus Ethnic Heredity" (on an early form of admixture analysis)
  - Shockley 1966, "Population Control or Eugenics." In J. D. Roslansky (ed.), Genetics and the Future of Man (New York: Appleton-Century-Crofts)
  - Shockley 1967, "The Entrenched Dogmatism of Inverted Liberals", manuscript by Shockley from which major portions were read in lectures
  - Shockley 1968, "Proposed Research to Reduce Racial Aspects of the Environment-Heredity Uncertainty", proposal read by Shockley before the National Academy of Science on April 24, 1968
  - Shockley 1968, "Ten Point Position Statement on Human Quality Problems", revised by Shockley from a talk which he presented on "Human Quality Problems and Research Taboos"
  - Shockley 1969, "An Analysis Leading to a Recommendation Concerning Inquiry into Eugenic Legislation", press release by Shockley, Stanford University, April 28, 1969
  - Shockley 1970, "A 'Try Simplest Cases' Approach to the Heredity-Poverty-Crime Problem." In V. L. Allen (ed.), Psychological Factors in Poverty (Chicago: Markham)
  - Shockley 1979, "Proposed NAS Resolution, drafted October 17, 1970", proposed by Shockley before the National Academy of Sciences
  - Shockley 1970, "New Methodology to Reduce the Environment-Heredity Uncertainty About Dysgenics"
  - Shockley 1971, "Hardy-Weinberg Law Generalized to Estimate Hybrid Variance for Negro Populations and Reduce Racial Aspects of the Environment-Heredity Uncertainty"
  - Shockley 1971, "Dysgenics – A Social Problem Evaded by the Illusion of Infinite Plasticity of Human Intelligence?", manuscript planned for reading at the American Psychological Association Symposium entitled: "Social Problems: Illusion, Delusion or Reality."
  - "Models, Mathematics, and the Moral Obligation to Diagnose the Origin of Negro IQ Deficits", W. Shockley, (1971)
  - "Negro IQ Deficit: Failure of a 'Malicious Coincidence' Model Warrants New Research Proposals", Shockley 1971
  - "Dysgenics, Geneticity, Raceology: A Challenge to the Intellectual Responsibility of Educators", Shockley 1972a
  - "A Debate Challenge: Geneticity Is 80% for White Identical Twins' I.Q.'s", Shockley 1972b
  - Shockley 1972, "Proposed Resolution Regarding the 80% Geneticity Estimate for Caucasian IQ", advance press release concerning a paper presented by Shockley
  - Shockley 1973, "Deviations from Hardy-Weinberg Frequencies Caused by Assortative Mating in Hybrid Populations"
  - Shockley 1974, "Eugenic, or Anti-Dysgenic, Thinking Exercises", press release by Shockley dated 1974 May 3
  - Shockley 1974, "Society Has a Moral Obligation to Diagnose Tragic Racial IQ Deficits", prepared statement by Shockley to be read during his debate against Roy Innis
  - Shockley 1978, "Has Intellectual Humanitarianism Gone Berserk?", introductory statement read by Shockley prior to a lecture given by him at UT Dallas
  - Shockley 1979, "Anthropological Taboos About Determinations of Racial Mixes", press release by Shockley on October 16, 1979
  - Shockley 1980, "Sperm Banks and Dark-Ages Dogmatism", position paper presented by Shockley in a lecture to the Rotary Club of Chico, California, April 16, 1980
  - Shockley 1981, "Intelligence in Trouble", article by Shockley published in Leaders magazine, issue dated 1981 June 15

=== Books ===
- Shockley, William – Electrons and Holes in Semiconductors with Applications to Transistor Electronics, Krieger (1956) ISBN 0-88275-382-7
- Shockley, William and Gong, Walter A – Mechanics Charles E. Merrill, Inc. (1966)
- Shockley, William and Pearson, Roger – Shockley on Eugenics and Race: The Application of Science to the Solution of Human Problems, Scott-Townsend (1992) ISBN 1-878465-03-1

=== Interviews ===
- Interview of William Shockley by Lillian Hoddeson on 1974 Sep. 10, Niels Bohr Library & Archives, American Institute of Physics, College Park, MD USA
- Playboy 1980, William Shockley interview with Playboy

== See also ==
- Nobel disease – Embrace of scientifically unsound ideas by some Nobel laureates
- History of the race and intelligence controversy
- Scientific racism
- Eugenics in the United States
